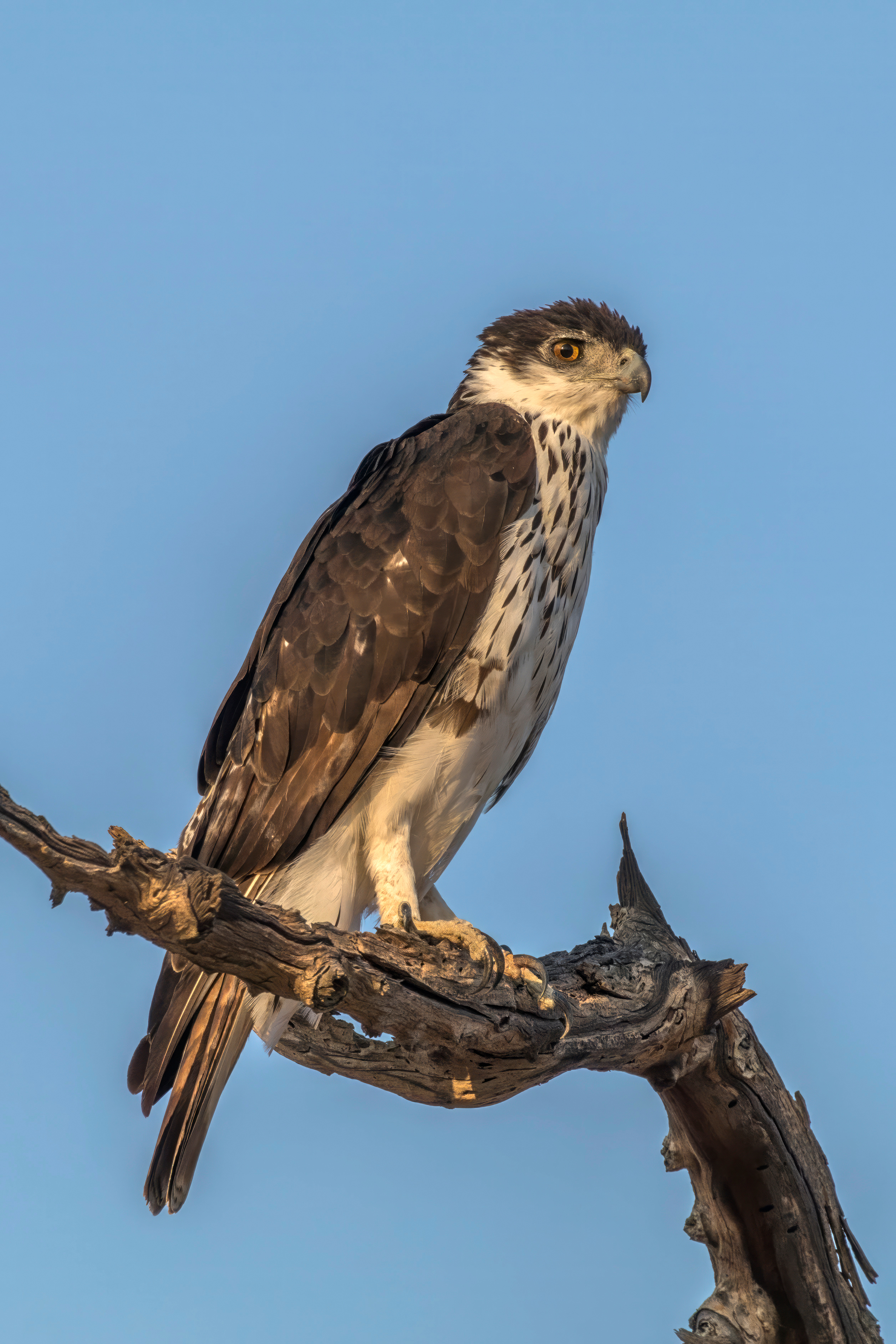
- in Namibia

Conservation status
- Least Concern (IUCN 3.1)

Scientific classification
- Kingdom: Animalia
- Phylum: Chordata
- Class: Aves
- Order: Accipitriformes
- Family: Accipitridae
- Genus: Aquila
- Species: A. spilogaster

Binomial name
- Aquila spilogaster (Bonaparte, 1850)
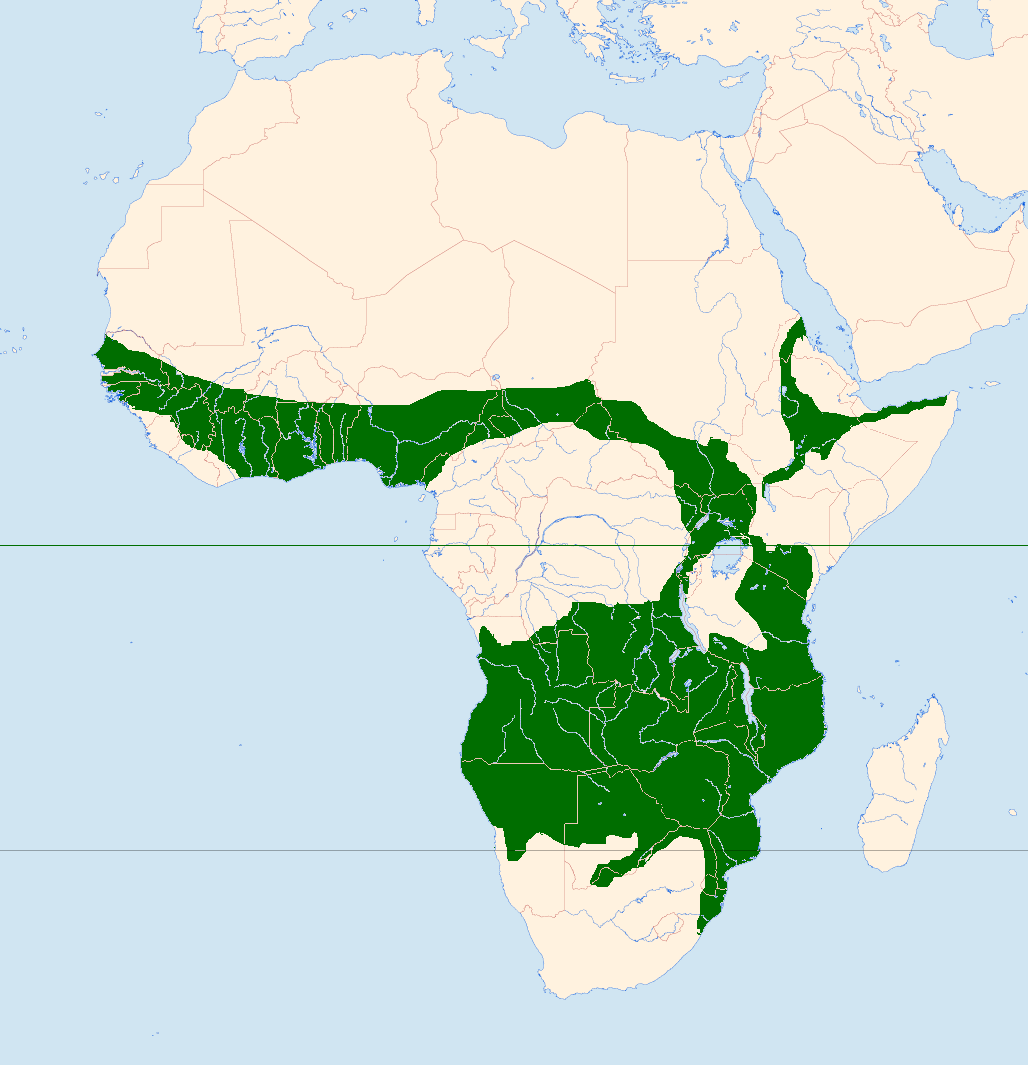

Synonyms
- Hieraaetus spilogaster

= African hawk-eagle =

Species of bird

The African hawk-eagle (Aquila spilogaster) is a large bird of prey. Like all eagles, it belongs to the family Accipitridae. This species' feathered legs mark it as a member of the Aquilinae subfamily. The African hawk-eagle breeds in tropical Sub-Saharan Africa. It is a bird of assorted woodland, including both savanna and hilly areas, but they tend to occur in woodland that is typically dry. The species tends to be rare in areas where their preferred habitat type is absent. This species builds a stick nest of around 1 m (3.3 ft) across in a large tree. The clutch is generally one or two eggs. The African hawk-eagle is powerfully built and hunts small to medium-sized mammals and birds predominantly, occasionally taking reptiles and other prey as well. The call is a shrill kluu-kluu-kluu. The African hawk-eagle is listed as Least Concern by the IUCN, but a study in 2024 showed that this species is experiencing a severe population decline of ~91%, suggesting it be listed as critically endangered.

== Taxonomy ==
The African eagle is a member of the Aquilinae or booted eagles. This is a rather monophyletic subfamily of approximately 38 species are classified in the subfamily, all bearing the signature well-feathered tarsi. The Bonelli's eagle (Aquila fasciata) was once lumped within the same species as the African hawk-eagle. However, there are several morphological differences between the two species, in addition to discrepancies in life history and their considerably allopatric distribution. Now, the two species are almost universally considered distinct species. Despite the differences between the Bonelli's eagle and the African hawk-eagle the two species are visibly similar and are still considered sister species. Recent DNA research has resulted in the two species being moved, in 2014, to the genus Aquila from Hieraaetus, along with a third possibly related species, the Cassin's hawk-eagle (Aquila africana). More specifically and surprisingly, Bonelli's, African hawk- and Cassin's hawk-eagles were found to be genetically closely related to the golden eagle (Aquila chrysaetos) species complex, which also includes Verreaux's eagle (Aquila verreauxii), Gurney's eagle (Aquila gurneyi) and wedge-tailed eagle (Aquila audax). These species are all rather larger and morphologically distinct (in adaptation to their generally open country habits, excepting the Gurney's) from the Bonelli's and African hawk-eagles and tend to have much more uniform and darker ventral plumages. Furthermore the four other traditional members of the Aquila genus have been revealed to be a separate species complex despite showing superficial similarity to the golden eagle group, i.e. being relatively large and long winged with usually rather uniform and dark (typically brownish) colours.

== Description ==
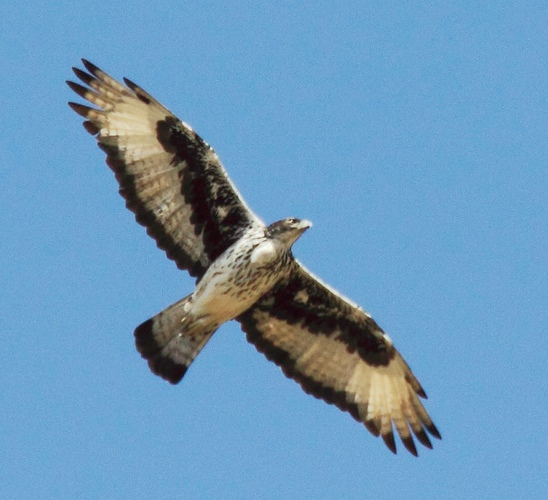
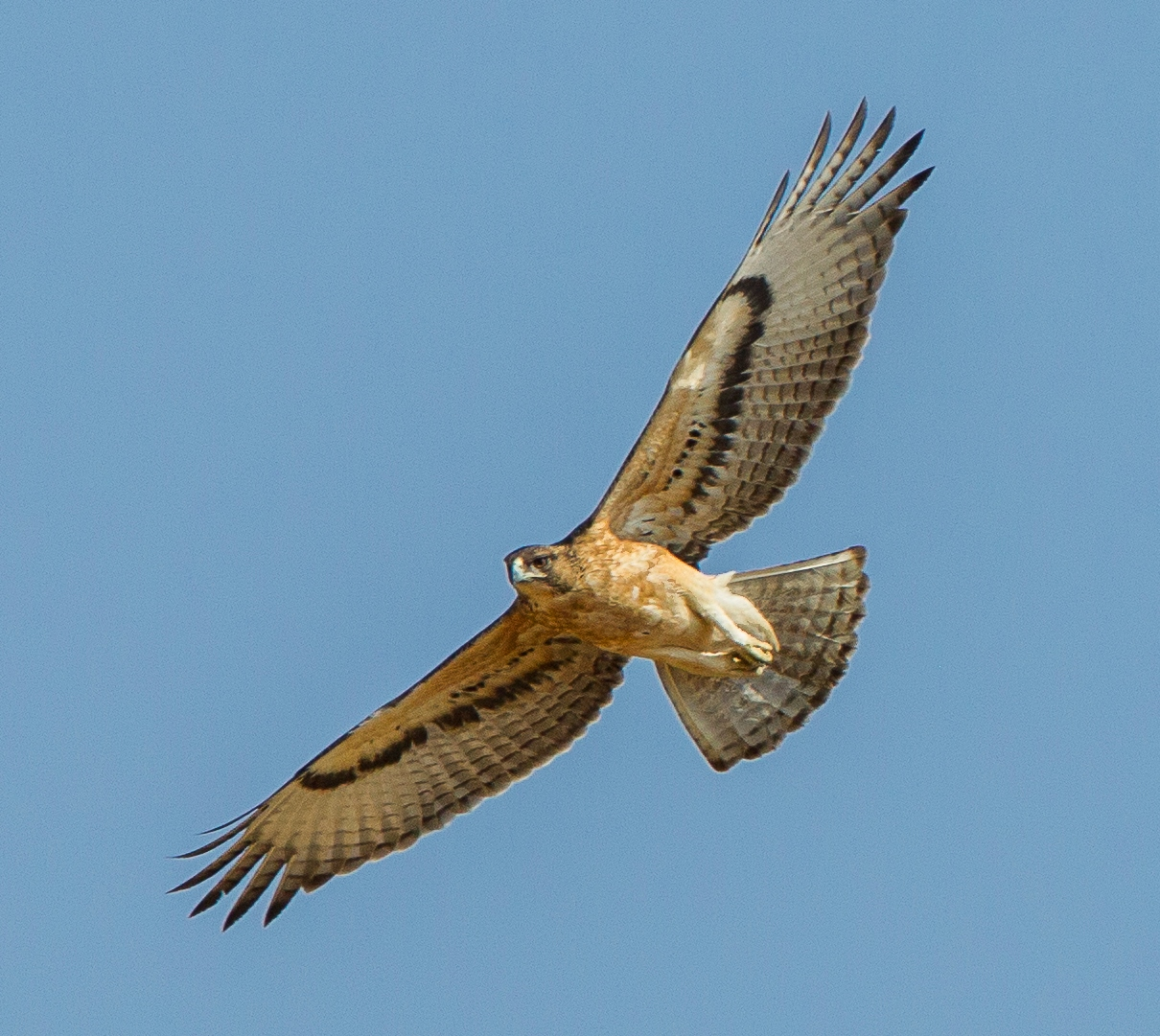
Adult and immature in flight

The African hawk-eagle has a somewhat small head but one that protrudes quite well due its quite long neck and relatively prominent beak. Furthermore, the species possesses a longish tail, with long and somewhat slender feathered legs and has large, robust feet. Although African hawk-eagles occasionally take to perching in the open, they usually are somewhat obscured for much of the day within the cover of foliage and often perch relatively low down in tall trees. The wing tips tend to fall a bit short of the tail tip. The adult African hawk-eagle evidences a fairly pied look with slate black-grey coloration above and whitish coloration below. At a distance, they may appear purely black-and-white but at close range they show sparse but extensive white flecks on the mantle and wing coverts. Occasionally, a greyer patch may be apparent on the folded secondaries of perched or sitting birds. The tail of an adult is grey with thin dark bars, a broad subterminal band and a white tail tip. The adult hawk-eagle's underside is white with bold but small and sparse drop-like blackish streaks. As was noted in a 2010 study, in a usual instance of plumage sexual dimorphism for an Aquilinae eagle, the underside tends to more sparsely marked on adult males and more densely marked on adult females to such a degree that an experienced observer may be able to sex individual African hawk-eagles despite the two sexes being similar in size. The adult African hawk-eagles has whitish coloring on the thighs and the crissum. The juvenile of the species is highly distinct from older hawk-eagles. Juveniles are moderately dark brown above with some pale edging, a slightly black-streaked head and a more clearly barred tail than adult hawk-eagles. The underside has a tawny-rufous base colour. When juvenile African hawk-eagles present black shaft streaks below they are usually only obvious on the flanks and they can border on being absent. Once developing as an immature at two to four years old, the upperside becomes progressively darker, the underside paler and more streaked and a subterminal tail band forms. At four years of age, as in related species, the African hawk-eagle becomes fully mature. The eyes of adult hawk-eagles are rich yellow while those of juveniles are hazel-brown while the cere and feet at all ages range from dull to somewhat brighter yellow.

In flight, the African hawk-eagle appears as a mid-sized raptor with a rather small but well-protruding head, a longish tail and wings that are neither particularly long nor broad. The species tends to flight with powerful and shallow beats. When gliding or soaring, their wings tend to be well-spread and, when engaging a glide, their carpal points tend to be only slightly forward pressed. Adult African hawk-eagle possess on the upperside of their wings a significant pale whitish-grey window on the base of their primaries, extending into dark grey panels across the black-tipped secondaries. The grey tail usually only shows obscure bars from a distance besides the broad subterminal band. From below, the black trailing edges with contrasting greyish white flight feathers as well as the more apparent subterminal band are in both cases distinctly abutted by paler grey feathering. The greater coverts show various solid black diagonal markings that coalesce and create a signature appearance from below in a flying adult African hawk-eagle. In flying juveniles, if seen from above, the contrasting creamy window, as in the adults, and barred tail stand out as the most distinct features of the species. Below, the juvenile African hawk-eagles show rufous wing linings that match the forebody and rather varying dusky edges, which often form carpal arcs and sometimes continuing as wing diagonals. The wings are otherwise rather nondescript in juvenile African hawk-eagles with greyish buff secondaries and tail thinly barred and white-based primaries.

=== Size ===
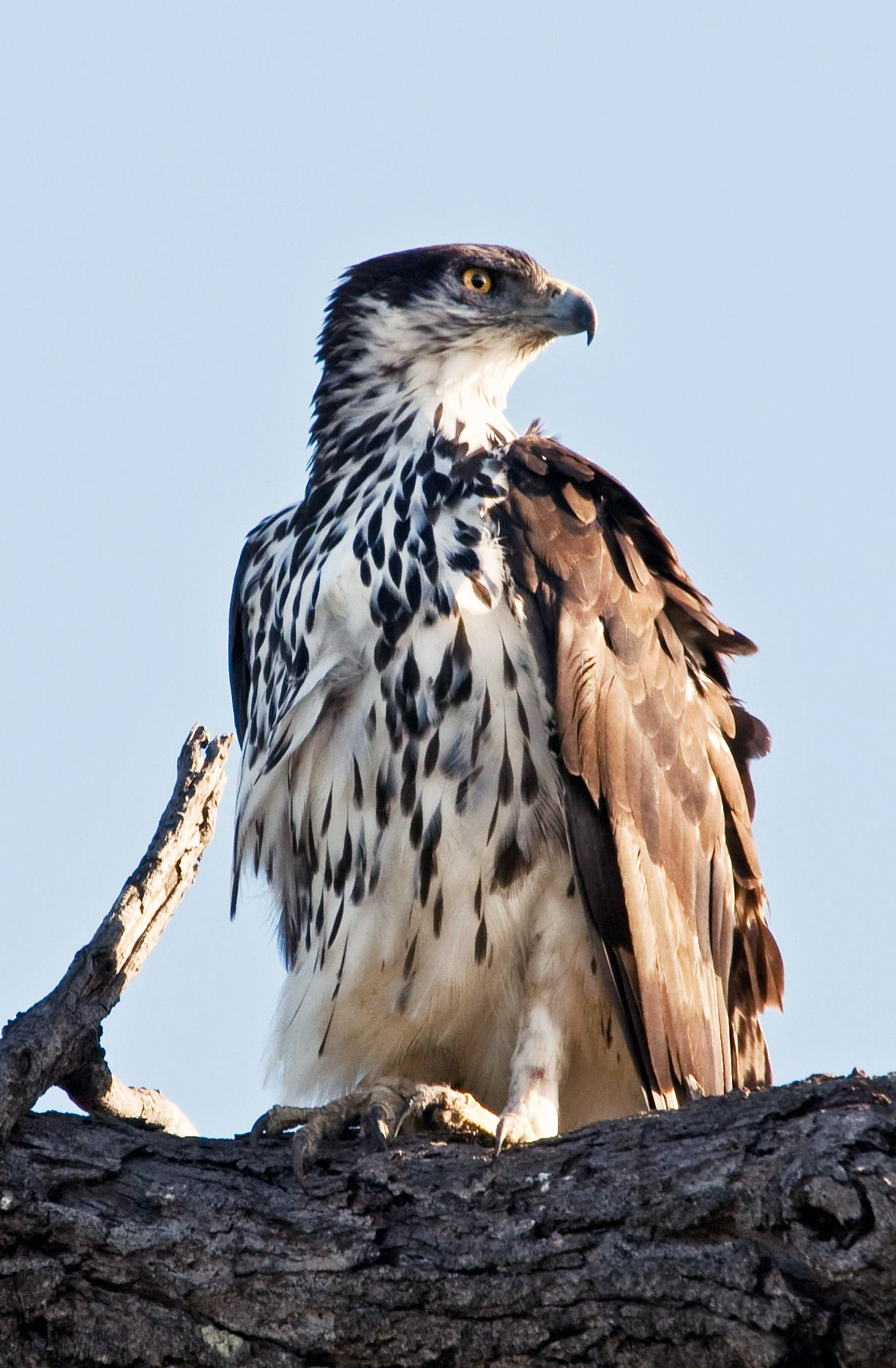
Early mature subadult African hawk-eagle, back not fully darkened and slightly mottled ventrally

The African hawk-eagle is a small-to-mid-sized eagle and a fairly large raptor. Despite its relatively modest size, this species can appear surprisingly large when perched or standing on the ground due in no small part to its long neck, long legs and rather upright posture. The sexes are rather similar in size for a bird of prey, but the females, in the expected sexual dimorphism, averages about 5% about larger and up to 20% heavier. On the other hand, there is reportedly little overall discrepancy in their foot size or particularly in talon size. In total length, African hawk-eagles may vary in length from 55 to 68 cm (22 to 27 in), with some of the largest females sometimes reported to measure to as much as 74 cm (29 in) (but the latter may be due to their former conflation with Bonelli's eagles). Mean length of a male may be around 60 cm (24 in) while the mean length of a female may be around 65 cm (26 in). Wingspan among this species may vary from 130 to 160 cm (4 ft 3 in to 5 ft 3 in). Body mass in males can vary from 1,250 to 1,750 g (2.76 to 3.86 lb) while the body mass of females can vary from 1,480 to 2,470 g (3.26 to 5.45 lb). In one sample, 14 males were found to have averaged 1,421 g (3.133 lb) while a sample of 10 males averaged 1,381 g (3.045 lb). In same datasets, 7 females averaged 1,700 g (3.7 lb) and 10 females averaged 1,631 g (3.596 lb). A sample of 36 unsexed African hawk-eagles in southern Africa averaged 141.7 cm (4 ft 8 in) in wingspan while an accompanying sample of 21 unsexed specimens averaged 1,480 g (3.26 lb) in body mass. Among standard measurements, the wing chord of males measures from 412 to 446 mm (16.2 to 17.6 in) while that of females is from 435 to 465 mm (17.1 to 18.3 in). African hawk-eagles measure in tail length from 225 to 290 mm (8.9 to 11.4 in) and, in a limited sample, in tarsus length from 90 to 100 mm (3.5 to 3.9 in). In Kenya, mean wing chord length of unsexed hawk-eagles was 433 mm (17.0 in), mean tail length was 253 mm (10.0 in), mean culmen length was 32.3 mm (1.27 in) and the hallux claw, the enlarged rear toe talon that is used as the primary killing apparatus on accipitrid raptors, measured a mean of 38 mm (1.5 in), measuring from 32.6 to 41 mm (1.28 to 1.61 in) in different specimens. The talon size is extremely large for this raptor's size, being similar to that of some eagles that are around twice as heavy such as eastern imperial eagles (Aquila heliaca).

=== Identification ===
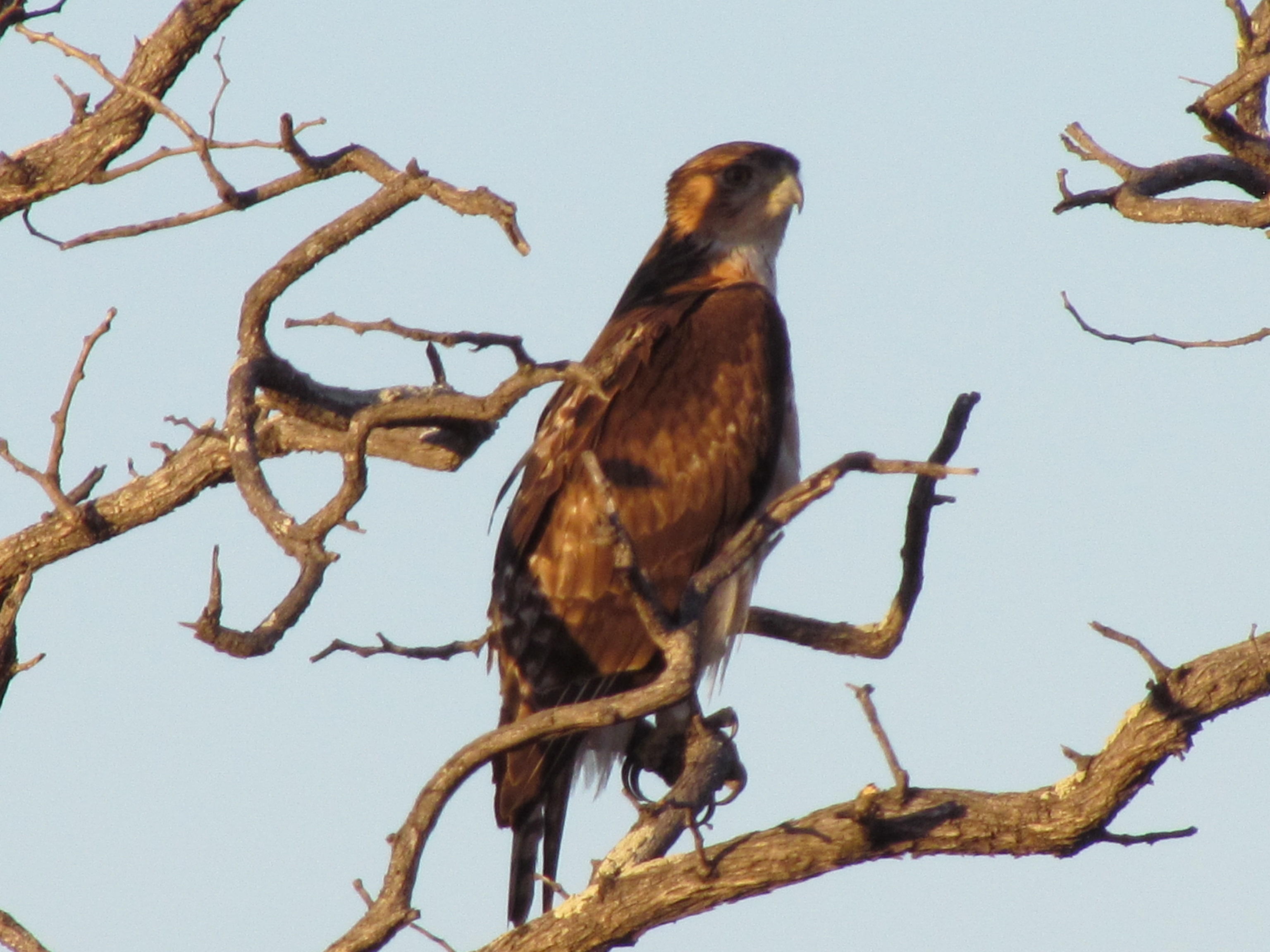
A juvenile African hawk-eagle. Before they attain the pied appearance of adults, juveniles of the species appear as a somewhat nondescript rufous raptor.

The African hawk-eagle is largely allopatric from the most similar extant species of eagle, its sister species, the Bonelli's eagle. However, they may need to be distinguished in the Red Sea area, where minimal range overlap occurs. The Bonelli's eagle is larger and relatively broader-headed, shorter-necked, with proportionately longer wings and a shorter tail. The adult Bonelli's is much lighter and browner dorsally with usually a white patch on the mantle but no paler wing panels above. The Bonelli's eagle tends to be less contrastingly marked below, being rather creamy and lacking strong markings. The juvenile Bonelli's is a bit more similar to the juvenile African hawk-eagle but can be told apart by proportions and by being paler backed and again lacks the clear "windows" of the juvenile hawk-eagle. There are a few other largely black dorsally and white ventrally largish raptors in sub-Saharan Africa but the African hawk-eagle is the largest and comes the closest to being typically aquiline in bearing and morphology. One species sometimes considered rather similar is the adult Ayres's hawk-eagle (Hieraaetus ayresii) but that hawk-eagle is smaller, more compact as well as being rounder headed. The Ayres's may show a nuchal crest and also lacks the windows seen on the wing upperside and is more evenly blotched or streaked all over the underbody, wing linings and legs. Additionally, the Ayres's hawk-eagle is less heavily darkly marked on the wings, being more spotted and splotched with black, lacking black trailing wing edges as well as the subterminal tail band of the African. Juvenile Ayres's can be similar in flight below to the juvenile African hawk-eagle but is usually paler rufous with darker quills and is generally much paler above with whitish scaling and rufous crown and mantle. Moreover, in all plumages, the Ayres's show white "landing lights", reminiscent of a booted eagle (Hieraaetus pennatus). Other raptors of a pied pattern vaguely reminiscent of the African hawk-eagle in Africa, such as the black sparrowhawk (Accipiter melanoleucus), the augur buzzard (Buteo augur) and the Cassin's hawk eagle (Aquila africana), are fairly obviously distinct in appearance and proportions as well as habitat. Of these three, the adult Cassin's is by far the most similar in structure and appearance to the African hawk-eagle but the two are mostly allopatric in distribution, with the Cassin's typically dwells in mature forests unlike the sparser, drier wooded-savanna habitats of the African hawk-eagle. Compared to the Cassin's hawk-eagle, the African species is larger, shorted tailed and much longer winged, with a much more heavily marked underbody, denser black about the mid-wings and barely barred quills. At a distance, the African hawk-eagle's flight profile can recall that of the European honey-buzzard (Pernis apivorus) but the head is even smaller in that species. Furthermore, the wing actions and patterning of this smaller Palearctic migrant is highly different, therefore confusion with the honey-buzzard is quite unlikely. Even more unlikely to be confused with the African hawk-eagles even at a distance is the far larger and bulkier crowned eagle (Stephanoaetus coronatus), which is highly distinct in colour and has relatively shorter but much broader wings. One other species that may be need to be distinguished in distant flight, this time from the juvenile African hawk-eagle, is the juvenile booted eagle. That species is smaller but proportionately much longer winged and shorter tailed than the juvenile African hawk-eagle. Furthermore, the booted species is barred on the tail and has completely different underwing pattern.

=== Vocalizations ===
The African hawk-eagle is generally silent outside breeding season. Its main call is melodious fluting klooee. The call is perhaps most often recorded in contact between pair members. The call is sometimes considered not unlike that of the often sympatric Wahlberg's eagle (Hieraaetus wahlbergi) but that of the African hawk-eagle tends to be less drawn out and more mellow in tone. The main call may be repeated or develop into klu-klu-klu-kleeee or kluu-kluu-kluu with variations. This extended call may be given both during courtship and in moments of aggression, such as when driving away other raptors near their nest. Often, African hawk-eagles call on near nest including repeated kweeooo or ko-ko-kweroo, which seemed to be repeated during nest construction and repair. A farther variation, a kwaak, may be made by both of a pair when they are excited near the nest. A squealing skweeyra call by the female is a probable food solicitation call when she sees the male. In additional, various squawks, clucks and softer notes, sometimes being considered as "conversational" or "intimate" calls. Feathered eaglets tend to solicits food with a high pitched insistent wee-yik wee-yik, wee-yik call.

== Distribution and habitat ==
The African hawk-eagle is found across much of sub-Saharan Africa. The farthest north the species ranges is in eastern Eritrea and adjacent areas of Ethiopia, after a substantial gap, the range resumes almost throughout southern Ethiopia. The African hawk-eagle is rare in West Africa, leading to a lack of study. Here the species may be found into southern Senegal, The Gambia, Guinea-Bissau, eastern Guinea, northernmost Sierra Leone, Côte d'Ivoire, Burkina Faso, the northern portions of Ghana, Togo and Benin and north-central Nigeria. In central and East Africa, the range of the African hawk-eagle includes southern Chad, southern Sudan, where they tend to be fairly rare, South Sudan, west Somalia, the central and southern portions of the Democratic Republic of the Congo and essentially all of Uganda, Kenya and Tanzania. This species is found throughout the northern nations (within favorable habitats) of southern Africa including Angola, Zambia, Mozambique, Malawi, Zimbabwe, north-central Namibia, northern and eastern Botswana and northeastern South Africa, north of the Orange River. The species is gone or nearly so from Eswatini, with the last confirmed breeding having been in 2002. Despite claims of the species as far as the Cape Province in South Africa, this is almost certainly due to records of vagrants and no population likely exists in southern South Africa.

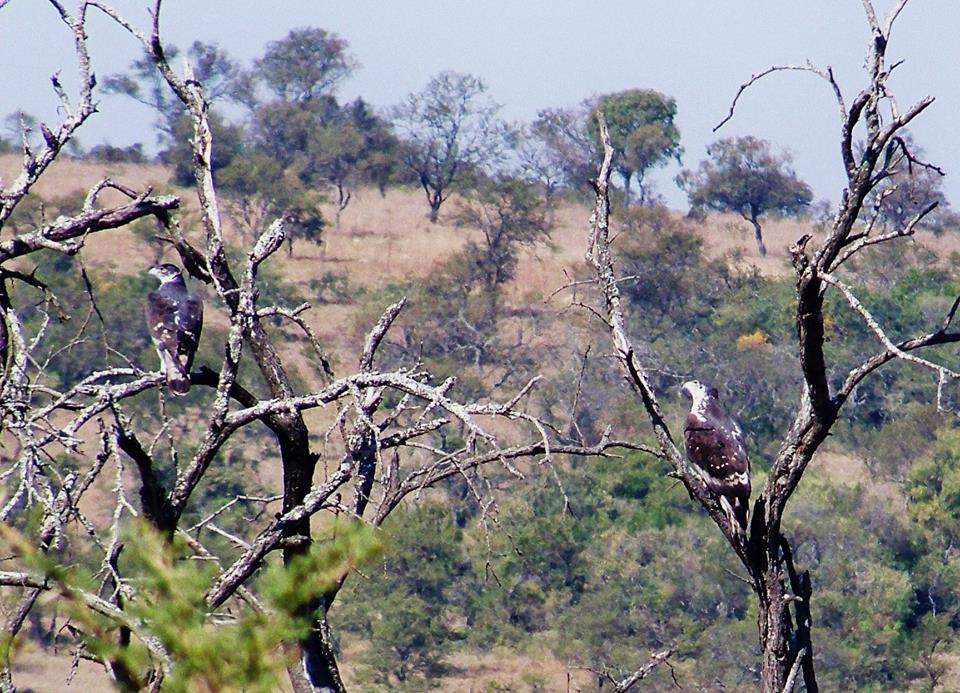
A pair in Limpopo shown in the typical dry, warm but lush woodland habitat preferred by the species

This is a bird of well-wooded countryside. This species tends to favor tropical broadleaf woodland and woodland edge within the savanna but does not tend to occur in true deep forest. Additionally, African hawk-eagles can adapt to thornbush areas such as the veld but tends to occur moreso within riparian zones, which tend to permit the growth of strips of taller trees. Miombo and especially Mopane woodland may be central to the existence of the species in southern Africa. As confirmed in study from Zimbabwe, more enclosed woodlands were avoided in favor of lower density woodlands. Overall, they tend to prefer fairly dry areas, but based on data from West Africa, Kenya and Botswana tend to prefer some moderate rainfall, with highly rainy areas such as Kenyan highlands tending to be avoided but also highly arid localities are avoided. Access to waterways, typically rivers, including ephemeral ones, and watering holes, is not infrequent, especially since they permit tall trees in otherwise fairly dry regions of Africa and also often hold concentrations of prey. Secondarily, they may be seen in fairly open, sparser savanna and assorted semi-desert areas whilst they generally avoid evergreen forests and mountainous areas. They have however been known to nest on cliff faces in Kenya but overall this is seldom-recorded and rare for this species, unlike in the Bonelli's eagle. There are records of this species visiting (if not nesting in) cultivation such arables and pastureland and occasionally nesting in well-treed and low-disturbance plantations. However, this species typically seems to require protected areas to successfully propagate in. The African hawk-eagle has been documented from sea level to around 3,000 m (9,800 ft), but mainly occurs below 1,500 m (4,900 ft).

== Diet and hunting ==
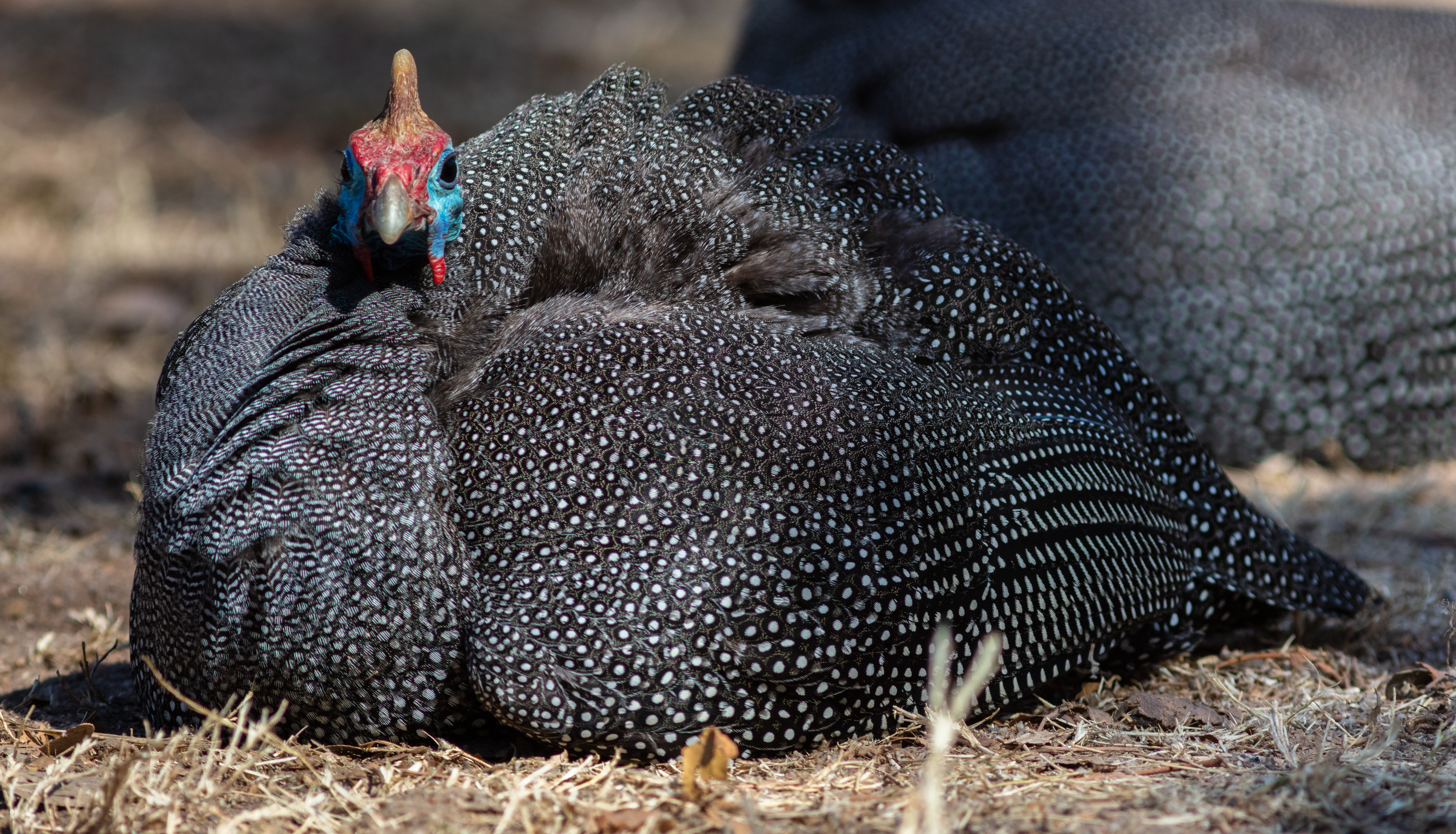
Gamebirds such as helmeted guineafowl are a favored part of the African hawk-eagle's diet.

The African hawk-eagle is an uncommonly aggressive and bold predator. Their primary hunting tool is their powerful feet. In general, their sneaky foraging techniques recall a very large accipitrine hawk, especially in terms of their short-distance flight after prey. Mostly the African hawk-eagle engages in still-hunting, wherein they scan from prey from an inconspicuous perch for a long period. When prey is spotted, the hawk-eagle engages in a low level dash from their perch in cover. They often uses cover to cloak their approach almost up the point where they strike. While it has been claimed that their flight is "silent", it would presumably be more correct to say that the hunting hawk-eagle engages in minimal flapping flight so as to not alert prey to their approach. Often, the hawk-eagles wait near prey-concentrated areas, such as waterholes and among riparian trees for birds to come to drink or by clearings that birds frequently cross. African hawk-eagles may also quarter above the ground and seize any prey they surprise. They are capable of sometimes taking birds on the wing but usually prefer to catch them on the ground and may force avian prey intercepted in the air back to the ground. Often terrestrial birds are taken right around the moment they alight. In some instances, prey may be chased, even on foot, into thickets. African hawk-eagles have seldom been recorded engaging a stoop from soaring flight to capture prey. Pairs of African hawk-eagles often hunt together and in these circumstances seem to engage in deliberate cooperation, one distracting, the other striking. They share this tendency for hunting in pairs with their sister species, the Bonelli's eagle, which has been inferred to engage in tandem hunts possibly for sociosexual pairing reasons rather than for obtaining larger or more difficult prey, as is typically assumed of tandem-hunting raptors. One tandem hunting pair of African hawk-eagles appeared to remarkably make use of a mesh fence to drive guineafowl into in a cunning strategy to prevent their escape. Yet another pair of African hawk-eagles appears to derive much of its prey by regularly and opportunistically perching in a tree holding a fruit bat colony.

A trained African-hawk eagles can habitually kill European hares (Lepus europaeus) around 4,080 g (8.99 lb) in weight, and one eagles around 1,420 g (3.13 lb) kills a large male domestic cat (Felis catus) around 4,300 g (9.5 lb). However, it is clear that wild eagles are usually focusing on much smaller prey. The typical prey of African hawk-eagles tends to be medium to large-sized birds and small-to-medium-sized mammals. Less usual prey can include reptiles and insects. As much as 74–86% of the diet can be birds and as much as 54–70% of the diet can be mammals. In general, due to a combination of factors such as their usual practice of keeping their nest area clean and their tendency to often evade researchers' notice due to hidden perch sites, the diet of African hawk-eagles is less well-known than that of larger African eagles or the Bonelli's eagles (especially in Europe). However, what is known suggests that this is an exceptionally powerful predator that may nearly rival much larger eagles such as martial eagles (Polemaetus bellicosus) in its ability to take large and middle-sized prey. A general picture has emerged that the African hawk-eagle is highly opportunistic and takes any variety of appropriately sized prey as it becomes available. When the habitat is locally overgrazed such as in Namibia, data suggests birds decrease in importance and mammals increase. When taking mammalian prey, they may select any mammal weighing usually more than 300 g (11 oz) of up to 4,000 g (8.8 lb). Largish ground feeding birds, such as francolins, spurfowls and guineafowls as well as mostly the smaller species of bustards and hornbills, seem to be the primary prey of African hawk-eagle. In Esigodini in Zimbabwe, it was found that 74% of the diet was birds. 69% of avian prey were found to be galliforms especially the helmeted guineafowl (Numida meleagris), which is of similar body size to the hawk-eagle itself, and Swainson's spurfowl (Pternistis swainsonii), which is about half the size of a hawk-eagle, in addition to three more francolins and spurfowls. In the Matobo Hills of Zimbabwe and surrounding hilly country, the main prey by number were Natal spurfowl (Pternistis natalensis) at 48% of the diet but the main prey by biomass was hyraxes, at 51.3% (making up 29% by number) compared to the spurfowl which comprised 32.8% of the biomass. Both Zimbabwe studies shows that African hawk-eagles would habitually take mammalian prey larger than itself, including scrub hares (Lepus saxatilis ) of an estimated average of 2,250 g (4.96 lb), and yellow-spotted rock hyrax (Heterohyrax brucei) and rarely Cape hyrax (Procavia capensis), of around 2,000 g (4.4 lb) with weights of infrequently up to 3,000 g (6.6 lb). Large prey was primary in Tsavo East National Park, where the main prey was Kirk's dik-dik (Madoqua kirkii), at 35% of the diet. Due to the low volume of nest that could be found and studied, only a few nests were examined for African hawk-eagles in Tsavo East and in these it was found that they principally took young dik-diks. Overall, the hawk-eagles estimated to take around 68 dik-diks annually in the park overall. Secondary prey in Tsavo East were red-crested korhaan (Lophotis ruficrista) (at 12.7%), common dwarf mongoose (Helogale parvula) (at 9.2%) and unstriped ground squirrel (Xerus rutilus) and eastern yellow-billed hornbill (Tockus flavirostris) (both at 7.2%). At a small sample from a nest in Namibia, 42% of the diet consisted of meerkat (Suricata suricatta). In the Northwest province of South Africa, the main prey were rock doves (Columba livia) (23.4%), Natal spurfowl (14%), 6.5% by unidentified doves and bush squirrels and 4.8% by Cape hyrax and crested francolins (Ortygornis sephaena). In Botswana, the main prey appeared to be hornbills, with one nest found to contain 25 southern yellow-billed hornbills (Tockus leucomelas) and only 5 southern red-billed hornbills (Tockus rufirostris) while elsewhere in the Zambezi Escarpment, the red-billed hornbills dominated the diet.

A small variety of different kinds of birds has been known to be taken opportunistically by African hawk-eagles. At times, they will prey on colonial nests of birds from weavers such as red-billed queleas (Quelea quelea) to herons. Seemingly infrequently taken birds have been known to include ostrich chicks, geese, plovers, cuckoos, herons and egrets, ibises, and a small diversity of passerines. Assorted birds taken with some frequency include grey go-away-birds (Crinifer concolor), brown-necked parrots (Poicephalus fuscicollis) and several species of dove. Domestic chickens (Gallus gallus domesticus) are sometimes taken in cultivated areas by African hawk-eagles, but the species is not thought to be as much of a poultry killer as it is made out to be. Other assorted mammals include a few species of squirrels and rats as well as fruit bats, bushbabies, and even those as small as Cape short-eared gerbil (Desmodillus auricularis). Larger mammals may include assorted species of mongoose to as large as the banded mongoose (Mungos mungo) and hare to as large as scrub hares, in many cases these may be as heavy or heavier than the hawk-eagle itself. Other large mammalian prey can include South African springhares (Pedetes capensis) and even small vervet monkeys (Chlorocebus pygerythrus). Besides smaller antelopes like dik-diks, the young of a few antelope are known to have been attacked by African hawk-eagles: klipspringers (Oreotragus oreotragus), steenboks (Raphicerus campestris) and lechwes (Kobus leche), the latter prey weighing an estimated 5,000 g (11 lb) and so perhaps the largest prey credited to the African hawk-eagle (although occasional adult dik-diks of up to a similar weight may also be attacked). Predation on reptiles seems to be fairly uncommon and few such prey are definitively identified, but both colubrid snakes and cobras are known to be included in their prey spectrum as well as lizards such as chameleons and giant plated lizards (Gerrhosaurus validus). One impressive reptilian prey item credited to an African hawk-eagle was a fairly large African rock python (Python sebae) seemingly taken alive, which would rival the largest mammalian prey in weight. Occasionally, this species is credited with insect predation, usually by juveniles, but it is not clear what variety of insects are consumed. Such prey must be considered very rare and may often be secondarily ingested from the stomachs of prey such as rodents and game birds. The African hawk-eagle is rarely reported to scavenge on carrion but one pair was seen to repeatedly feed on the carcass of a southern reedbuck (Redunca arundinum) over 3 days.

=== Interspecific predatory relationships ===
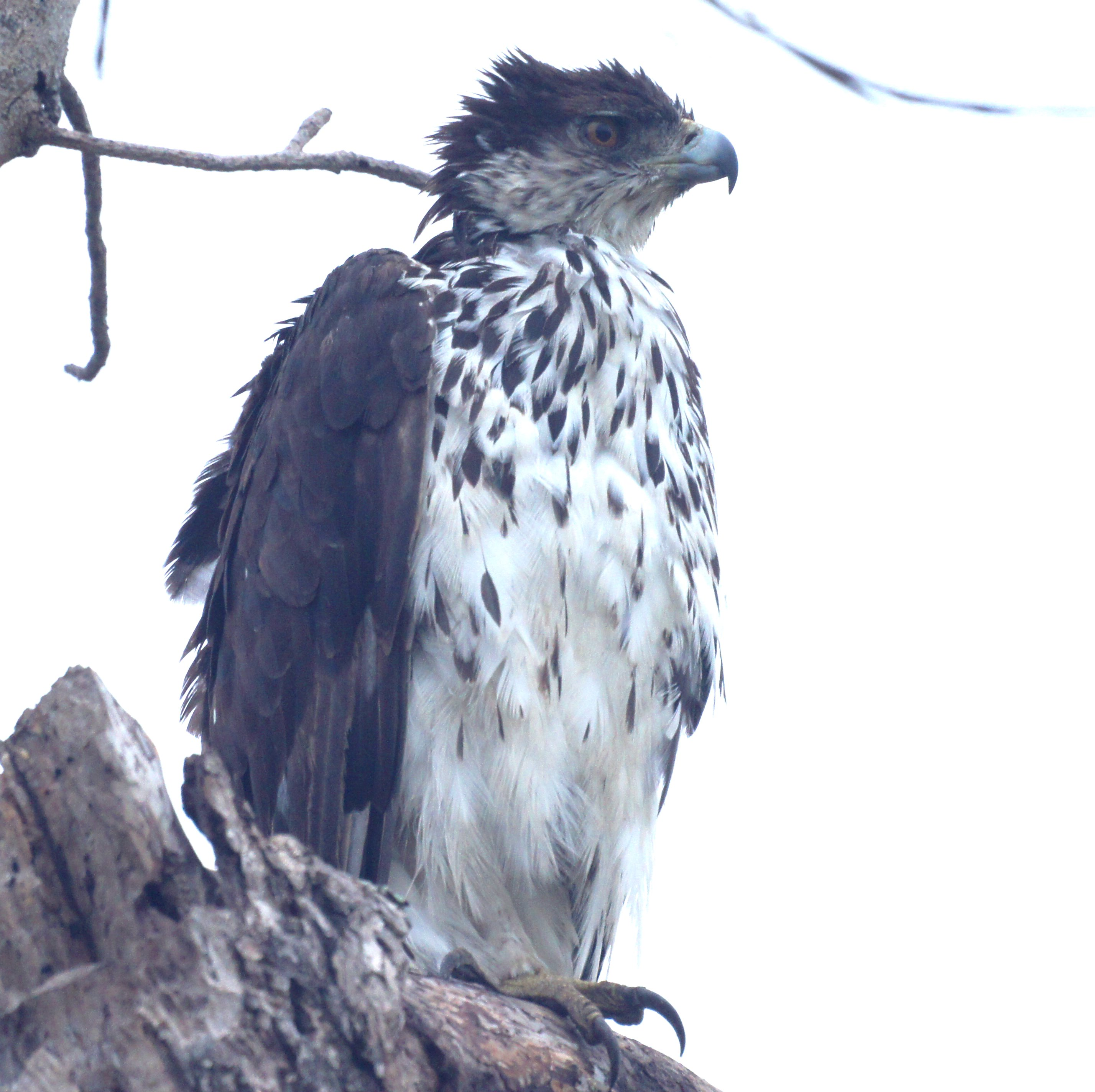
An African hawk-eagle surveys its surroundings. This species tends to be aggressive towards larger raptors.

The African hawk-eagle exists in a highly competitive region for birds of prey. They are obligated to share prey with both smaller and larger raptorial birds and have overlapping habitat areas with them as well. In Tsavo East National Park, 50% of prey was shared with tawny eagles (Aquila rapax), 37% with bateleur (Terathopius ecaudatus) and 54% with martial eagles. Tawny eagles and bateleurs are about 25% larger in body mass than the African hawk-eagle while the martial eagle can be around three times larger than the hawk-eagle. The African hawk-eagle stands as the only of the four focused-on eagles in Tsavo East to nest apart from the other eagles due to habitat use, since it is the only one to use woodland over more lightly treed savanna, probably mitigating the most fierce of the competition. All four eagles mostly preyed on Kirk's dik-diks in Tsavo East but also their nesting periods were slightly staggered with the bateleur nesting rather earlier in the year than the others on average and the African hawk-eagle on average nesting the latest, so that the primary pressure on dik-dik prey was naturally staggered. In the hill country of Zimbabwe, similarly the findings were that highly diverged nesting areas were used compared to other eagles, namely the primarily forest-nesting crowned eagle and primarily rock-nesting Verreaux's eagle. All three eagles hunted hyraxes in the hilly areas for primary prey by weight, supplemented by young antelopes for crowned eagles and gamebirds (which were primary in number) for African hawk-eagles. However, the larger eagles (both more than twice as heavy than the hawk-eagle) primarily took hyraxes taken that were usually rather bigger than those taken by hawk-eagle, normally being at least 2,000 to 3,000 g (4.4 to 6.6 lb) for the crowned and the Verreaux's while that was the very largest sizes hunted by the hawk-eagles. The African hawk-eagle was found to have the most diverse diet of the larger raptors of the region. Despite its staggered nesting areas from other eagles, it was evidenced in the hill country of Zimbabwe that the larger raptors such as the crowned and Verreaux's eagles are attacked rather frequently, usually during flying bouts near the territories of the African hawk-eagles. These findings are consistent with elsewhere, showing that larger eagles are commonly attacked by the hawk-eagles, possibly either for competitive or mobbing purposes. The predators for the African hawk-eagle are not known and studies have indicated that adult hawk-eagles have little to fear and may fulfill the niche of an apex predator, albeit one that focuses on smaller prey typically than the considerably larger eagles it co-exists with. Predation on other birds of prey is rarely documented, unlike with Bonelli's eagles, but the African hawk-eagle has been known to hunt down barn owls (Tyto alba) and black-winged kites (Elanus caeruleus).

== Behaviour and breeding ==
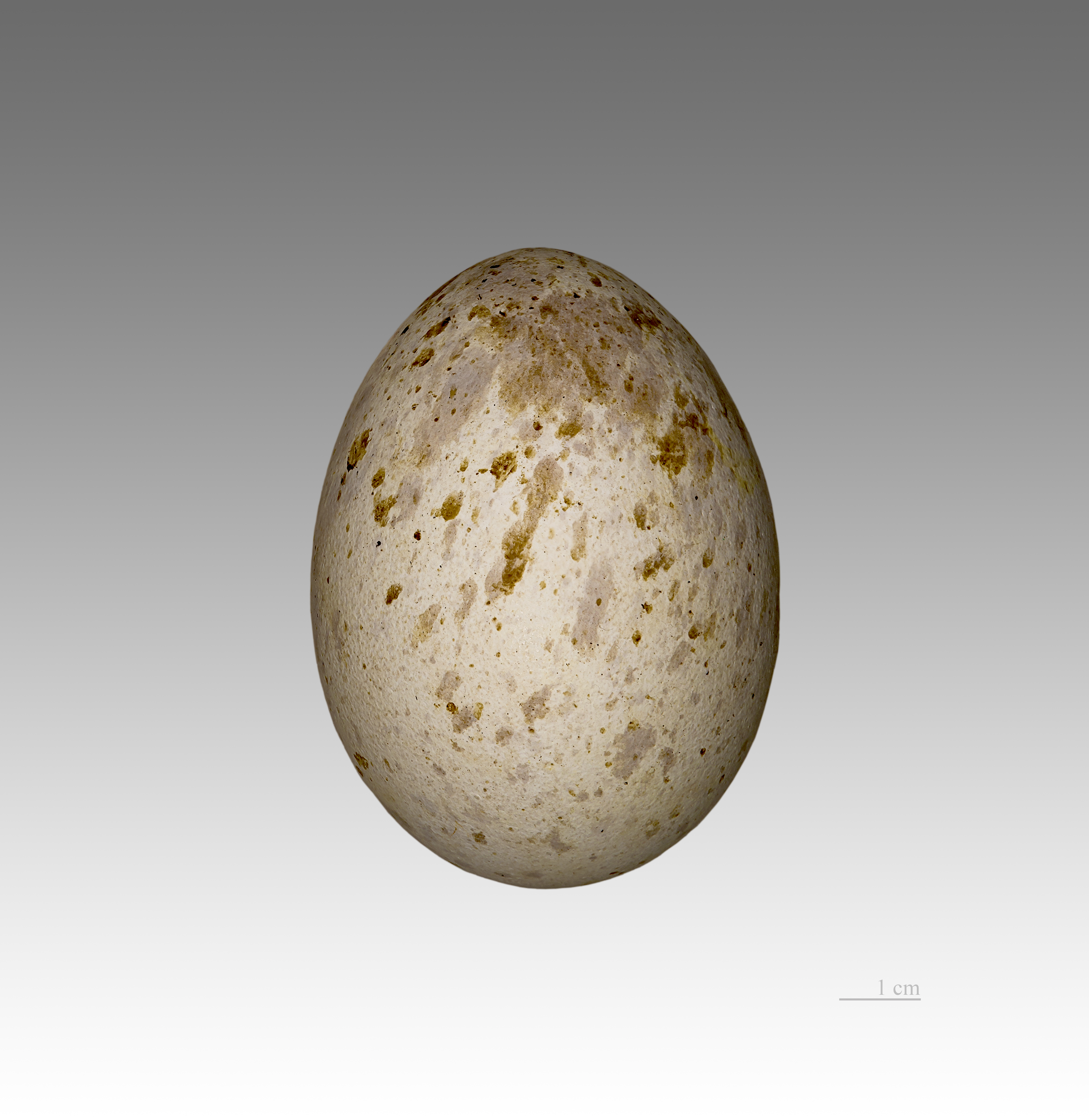
Aquila spilogaster egg

The African hawk-eagle tends to be solitary but adults frequently occur in pairs, perhaps spending more time together than is typical of many raptors. Breeding territories are established with aerial displays, which are fairly uninvolved compared to some related species. The displays are usually little more than mutual circling with intermittent calling but males sometimes uncommonly do engage in sky dances, probably only in breeding displays rather than territorial exclusion displays. During the sky dance they engage in relatively shallow undulations with steep plunges and short rises with little wing flapping. In many cases, the male will dive towards the female and the female, in turn, turns to the male and displays her claws. This mating ritual culminates in the male presenting the female with nuptial gifts in the form of prey. This species is typically highly monogamous and it is quite typical for adults to pair for life. However, a potential case of polygyny may have occurred in Ethiopia. The breeding season occurs from October to April in the north of the Equator, while it is in February–June in The Gambia. In East Africa, the nesting season is often into April–January. In Uganda, egg laying was reported in September to November with a juvenile bird seen by January. Down to Botswana and northeastern South Africa the nesting season is somewhat variable, recorded from April to October, with egg-laying peaking in June according to one authority. Nesting is ultimately timed to line up with the regional dry season.

=== Nest ===
The nest tends to be a very substantial platform-like structure of large sticks. It is typically located in the main fork or well out on a lateral branch of a large tree. The height of the nest has been recorded as being from 4 to 36 m (13 to 118 ft) above the ground, generally falling somewhere between 9 and 13 m (30 and 43 ft). In southern Africa, a nest at a height of 4.2 m (14 ft) was considered unusually low. Common tree species used as nests are Acacia, Adansonia, Khaya, Terminalia and non-native Eucalyptus. Quite often, the nest trees are located in riparian areas. Rarely to exceptionally, nests may be placed elsewhere other than a tree. This seems to be case generally in East Africa where rare nests have been documented in a bush or on cliff ledge. In southern Africa sometimes nests have been placed on pylons. Nesting locations typically provide some shade but some nest sites are rather exposed, necessitating the shading of the eaglet by the female, even to a period longer than the nesting period. The nest itself is typically from 50 to 80 cm (20 to 31 in) deep or sometimes more, sometimes over 125 cm (49 in) with repeated additions. The interior cup of the nest is about 25 to 30 cm (9.8 to 11.8 in) with the overall nest diameter is up to about 100 cm (39 in). Nests repairs consists of building up the rim after the previous years flattened, reinforcing by adding new layers of sticks. Building takes about 4 to 5 weeks and sometimes repairs as long as 8 weeks. It make take several months for a new nest's construction. Limited observation suggests the male mate takes primary role in nest repair but the female may be more active in new nest construction. Females may add a majority of the fresh green leaves recorded in nests. The species tends to prefer a narrow breeding area with favorable habitat for nesting site, and in one extreme case the same general grove near Pretoria was used by different generations of hawk-eagles from 1912 to 1978. In Zimbabwe bushveld two nests were found 12 km (7.5 mi) apart, in Kruger National Park nests were estimated to be 5 km (3.1 mi) apart and in the well-wooded areas of the Matobos, nests were only 3 km (1.9 mi) apart.

=== Eggs and incubation ===
The African hawk-eagle usually lays a clutch of 2 eggs. More infrequently, a clutch of 1 to 3 eggs may be laid. In Zambia, 46% of nests had one egg, the remainder all had 2 in a sample of 13 nests. However, in Malawi, 80% of 15 nests had two eggs with only the remaining 20% having one. As of the early 1980s, only one recorded nest in southern Africa was said to contain a 3 egg clutch. The eggs have a chalky white ground color with very variable markings, varying from handsomely blotched speckled with dull rust-red to quite plain to showing coalesced markings on either end. The eggs can measure 59.5 to 75.2 mm (2.34 to 2.96 in) in height, averaging 64.5 mm (2.54 in), by 46 to 55.7 mm (1.81 to 2.19 in) in diameter, averaging 51.3 mm (2.02 in), in sample of 123. Only particularly large eggs are said to measure over 70 mm (2.8 in) high. The weight of eggs is reported 75 to 100 g (2.6 to 3.5 oz), averaging some 87 g (3.1 oz). The eggs in a multiple egg clutch are laid at about 3 or 4 day intervals, with the incubation beginning with the first egg laying. The incubation stage lasts for 42-44. The female does most of the incubation, relieved only for short spells by males who usually bring prey for her. Male incubation can be as long as an hour but usually much shorter. Over 28 hours of observation over 9 days at 2 nests, the females of the two pairs incubated a mean of 82.6% of the time to the males' 7.1%, while the remainder no incubation. Green leaves are still added by both members of the pair during incubation.

=== Nesting and fledging stages ===
A chick African hawk-eagle may take just under 2 days to hatch. Newly hatched eaglets are covered in dark grey down with whitish down on abdomen and thighs, with dull yellow cere and feet. The first coat of grey gives way to thicker and whiter second coat, by 2 weeks only head and back have any grey down. By 3 weeks down predominantly white only head grey, with first remiges breaking out of quills. Feather development rapid at a month old and by 5 weeks well feathered below. At 6 weeks, the eaglet will only have remaining down on head, crop and abdomen, fully feathered by a week later but for wings and tails. The weight of 2 days old eaglets is about 80 g (2.8 oz), about 200 g (7.1 oz) at 9 days, 740 g (1.63 lb) at 21 days, 950 g (2.09 lb) at 28 days, 1,135 g (2.502 lb) at 35 days, and 1,250 g (2.76 lb) at 49 days. In terms of developmental growth, at 5 days old, nestling African hawk-eagles are just barely able to preen themselves and by 11 days can move slightly around the nest. Young eaglets spend a great deal of the day sleeping and most awake activity involves preening and feeding. Only at the age of 24 days can the chicks defend the nest, stand reasonably well and make a few rather clumsy wing exercises; however at this stage they cannot tear meat off of the food that a parent provide. When the eaglet is 32 days old it is mainly attended to for feeding, stands well and exercises wings. At 50 days of age, the chicks show signs of fledging through being able to feed themselves and through flapping their wings. Around this stage they may preen quite a lot, nibble on sticks of the nest and make mock kills of prey bones and of sticks. Some of these activities are said to improve coordination. Fledgling begins at between 60 and 70 days of age, reports of as little as 41 days for fledgling are probably dubious. Post-nesting attachment to parental care is not long for a tropical raptor, typically lasting about 3 to 4 weeks. Thereafter, the young African hawk-eagle may be seen farther afield but then again some are seen in the company of their parents for as long as 2 months after fledging.

A 2008 study found that the first-born chick in a nest will crush, acquire more food than, and almost inevitably kill the second, smaller chick. The smaller chick typically has little chance of survival given the size differences of the two. In one case, the younger one weighed 62 g (2.2 oz) upon hatching, when its sibling was already 142 g (5.0 oz), in another case the weights at the corresponding ages were 64 g (2.3 oz) and 111 g (3.9 oz). This is a common occurrence in many bird species, particularly predatory birds, which allows for a chick to thrive and in the unlikely event that the first chick dies, there will be the second chick to propagate the species. According to a 1959 study, the instinct for two chicks to fight subsides after a few weeks thus if the second chick manages to survive for that long, the chances that it will fledge will be increased. The same paper suggests that intrabrood cannibalism likely follows a siblicide event. No cases of two successfully raised young were documented in southern Africa by the 1980s but two fledglings have been claimed produced in about 20% of Kenyan nests. The reasons for the discrepancies in the two regions is not well-understood.

=== Parental behaviour ===
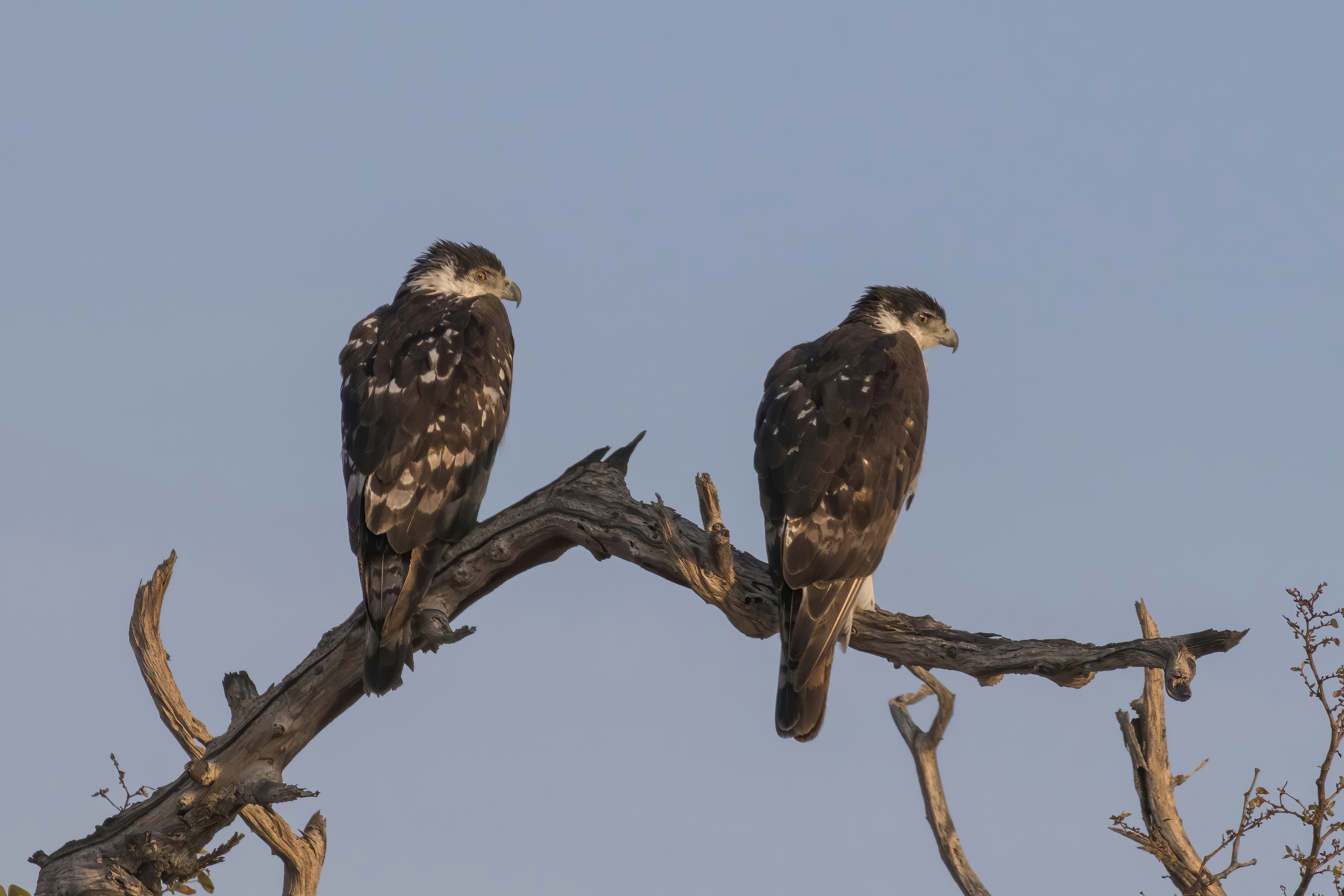
A likely pair in Damaraland, Namibia. African hawk-eagles appear to spend much time in pairs.

Parental attention may be loosely divided into three main stages: from hatching up to 2 weeks, from 2–4 weeks and from 4 weeks to fledging. During the first period, the female largely remains on nest and broods a great deal, while, as at most stages, the male provides prey but then again has been known to brood and feed a small eaglet. Upon the 2nd week, the eaglet(s) are not nearly as closely brooded. In the second 2-4 week period, the female is at nest much less but she usually perches in nest tree, male still provides much of the prey and the female continues to feed, and shade if necessary, the eaglet. During the 3rd stage, parental time at nest drops much farther and the female may still sleep on the nest overnight but possibly apart from eaglet. Only at very late stage does female start to catch prey for eaglet. Nests tend to be kept very clear; with female known to disperse pellets elsewhere and much avian prey is brought well plucked, making prey identification difficult. The parent African hawk-eagles are known to highly aggressive in protecting their nest and regularly dive on threatening or novel animals who approach the nest. Humans are not infrequently attacked around the nest and especially if climbing towards the nest, resulting in potentially painful injuries. The species ranks as perhaps one of the most aggressive African eagles in defending its nest against humans, alongside the crowned eagle, and is much more prone to diving at humans than nesting Bonelli's eagles.

=== Breeding success and dispersal ===
In a study conducted in Zimbabwe in 1988, 116 African hawk-eagle pairs were assessed in terms of breeding success in two areas of varying substrate quality. It was found that nests were placed in flat-crowned thorn trees in areas with basaltic soils and round-crowned, rough-barked trees in areas with sandy soil. Rainfall affected breeding success, laying dates and the sizes of clutches with higher success, later laying dates and larger clutch sizes correlating with higher rainfall. More breeding attempts were made in open woodland areas than in closed however the number of resulting chicks did not differ between vegetation structure. The African hawk-eagle is usually a rather sedentary and stable breeding raptor, seldom leaving a devoted area holding good prey numbers and habitat. However, one rather unsuccessful pair was recorded to have used 4 different sites in 9 years, atypical behavior for the species. Usually this species is able to breed annually, unlike many other African eagles. For instance, at a nest site in Zimbabwe there only 2 non breeding years in 17 years, productivity overall was 0.82 young per nest per year. Other nests in Zimbabwe often failed and egg infertility was a problem, mean overall productivity was 0.54. In Kenya, 15 young were produced in 27 pair years, productivity of 0.56 young per pair per year. The mortality of young African hawk-eagles, i.e. under 4 years old, may be extremely high in some localities, up to 75%, mainly due to assorted anthropogenic causes such as persecution and collisions with manmade objects such as wires. Despite the reputation for being sedentary, according to a 2006 book, juveniles of this species can disperse considerably from the breeding grounds. The mean distance for African hawk-eagles from their ringing as nestlings to recovery was 25 km (16 mi) in southern Africa. Similarly an adult hawk-eagle found dead in the Matobos was only 15 km (9.3 mi) away from its natal site. However, one ringed hawk-eagle was found to have moved a distance of 795 km (494 mi) from Limpopo in South Africa to Victoria Falls on the Zambia-Zimbabwe border, perhaps as a response to a prolonged dry spell and resulting diminishing food resources.

== Status ==
The African hawk-eagle has a very wide range and is a relatively common species. No particular threats have been identified but the population is thought to be declining slowly. The International Union for Conservation of Nature has rated its conservation status as being of "least concern". BirdLife International estimated the total number of adults at around 100,000 birds, but that the supporting data are poor. In the former Transvaal province of South Africa the population of hawk-eagles was thought to be about 1,600 pairs, while overall in the southern African region an extrapolated total number of about 7,000 pairs was estimated. A 2006 study found that the African hawk eagle, among other raptor species have been declining at high rates outside of protected areas in West Africa and only seem to be stabilizing through the efforts of national parks. When numbers from 2003 to 2004 are compared to 1969-1973 in West Africa, it is found that numbers have declined even in protected areas. Overall negative population trends have also been detected for some time in southern Africa. Despite claims that declines in Malawi are due to persecution of the African hawk-eagle as a poultry thief, the much stronger cause is likely to be the pervasive destruction of woodlands. The declines are strong enough in southern Africa for the species to be thought to be extinct as breeding in Eswatini.
