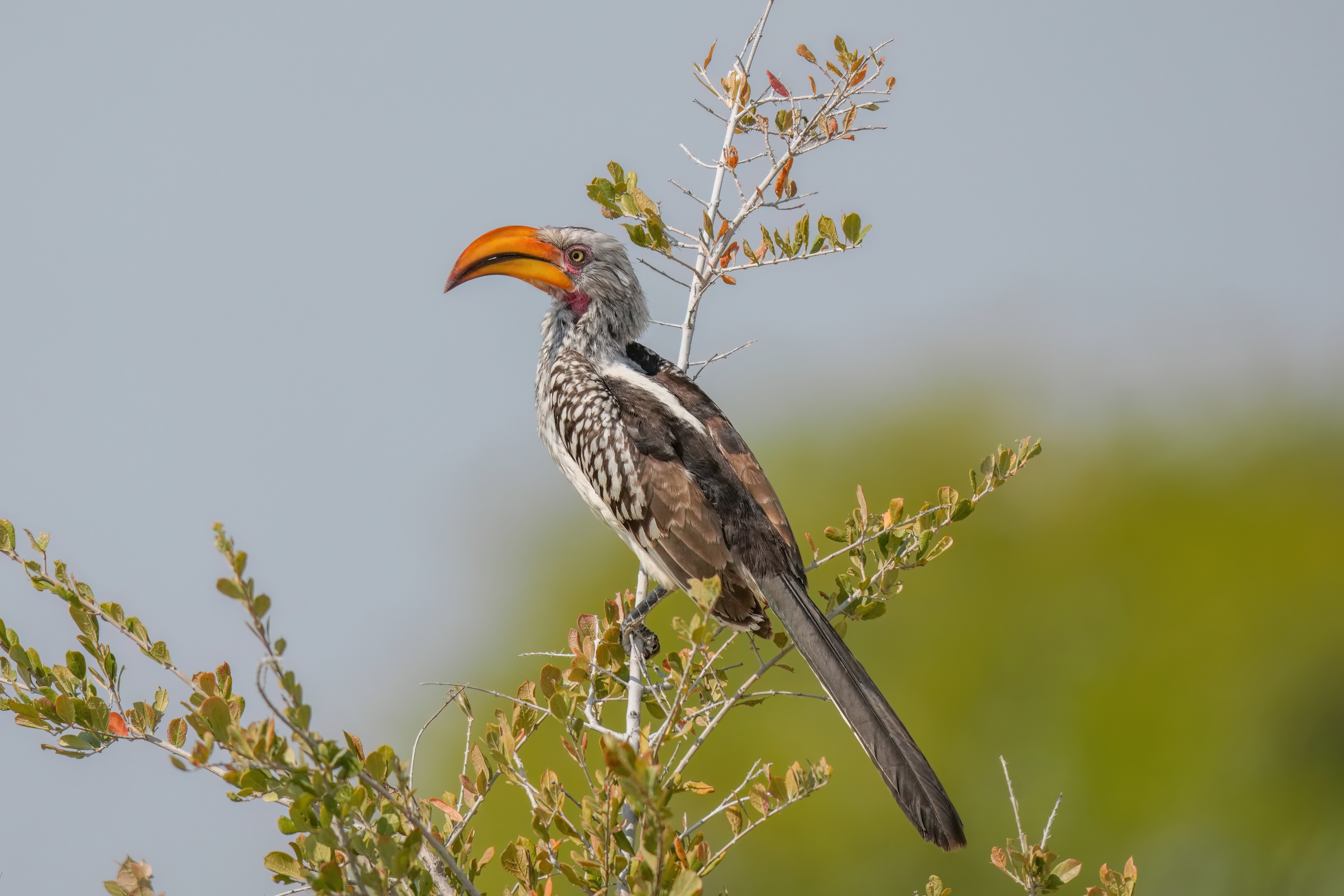
- Adult male in Etosha National Park, Namibia

Conservation status
- Least Concern (IUCN 3.1)

Scientific classification
- Kingdom: Animalia
- Phylum: Chordata
- Class: Aves
- Order: Bucerotiformes
- Family: Bucerotidae
- Genus: Tockus
- Species: T. leucomelas

Binomial name
- Tockus leucomelas (Lichtenstein, MHC, 1842)
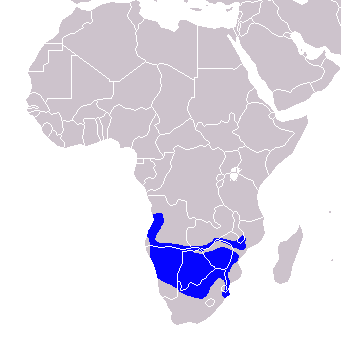
- resident range

= Southern yellow-billed hornbill =

Species of bird

The southern yellow-billed hornbill (Tockus leucomelas) is a hornbill found in southern Africa. Yellow-billed hornbills feed mainly on the ground, where they forage for seeds, small insects, spiders and scorpions. This hornbill species is a common and widespread resident of dry thornveldt and broad-leafed woodlands. They can often be seen along roads and water courses.

== Description ==
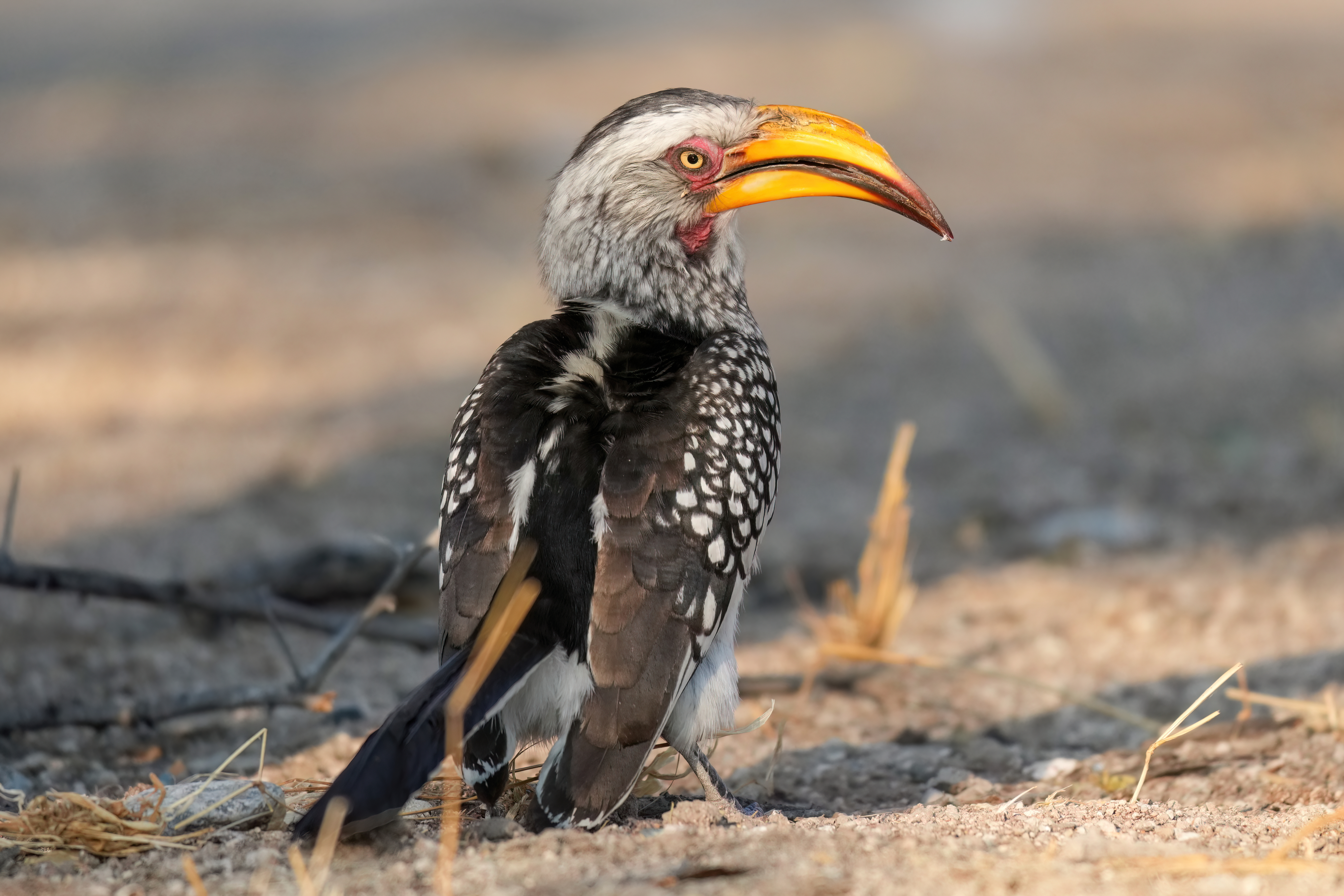
Adult female in Etosha National Park, Namibia. She has a shorter bill, with shorter casque, than the male.

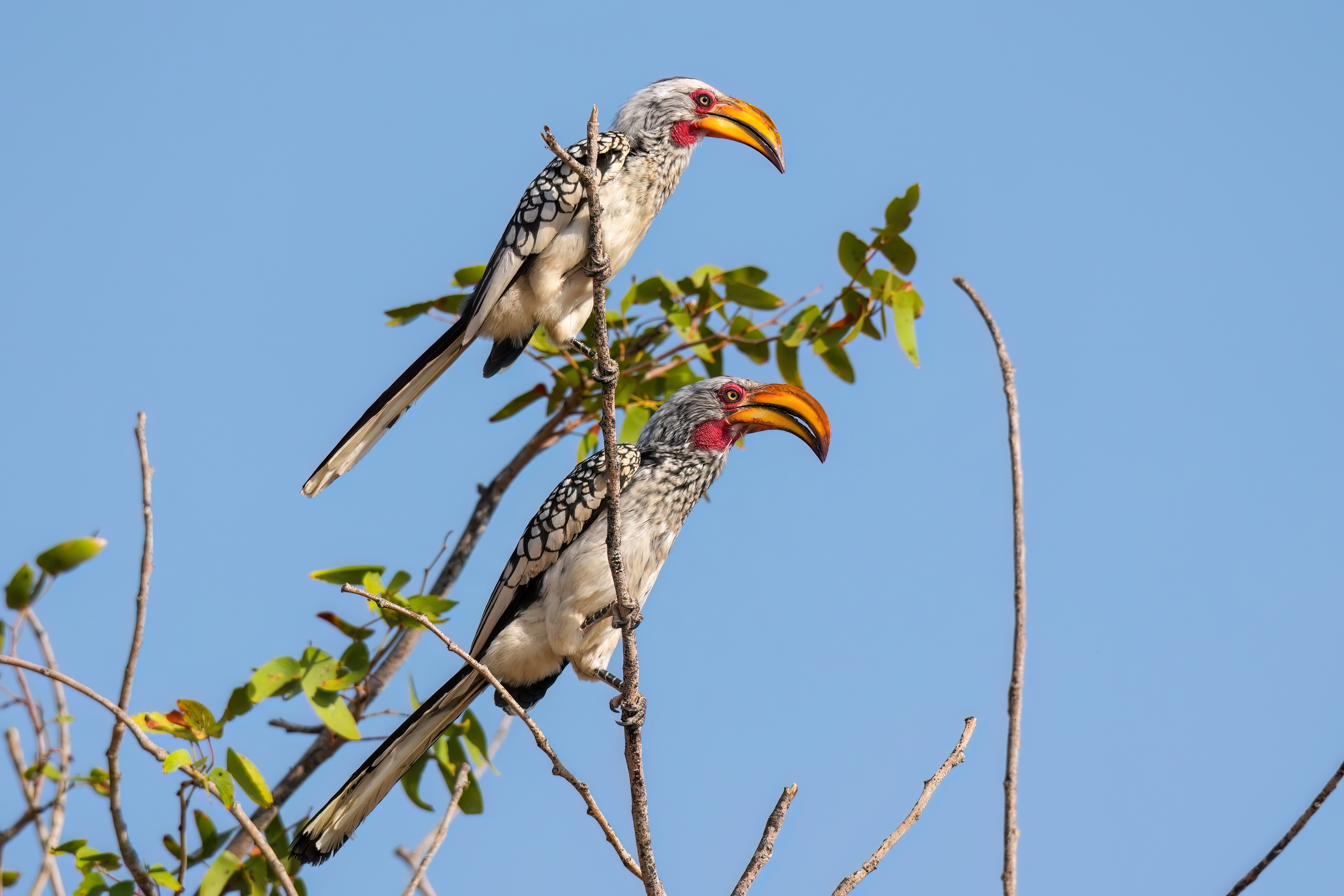
Male and female couple in Damaraland, Namibia

It is a medium-sized bird, 48–60 cm (19–24 in) in length, 132–242 g (0.29–0.53 lb) in weight and is characterized by a long yellow and down-curved beak. This beak is huge in comparison to its body and can account for up 1/6th of the entire body length. Male beaks are on average 90 mm long while female beaks are an average of 74 mm. Males are generally bigger than females but there is overlap between the sexes. The size difference of the beak is a fairly reliable way of differentiating sex in wild hornbills.

The casque that characterizes all hornbills is of a very modest size in the southern yellow-billed hornbill. It is small, but it covers almost the entire length of the beak in males (less so in females), and may give the impression that they do not actually have a casque. As in all hornbills, the size of the beak actually intrudes on the frontal vision of the bird and the first two neck vertebrae are fused together.

Also, like most other hornbills, they possess a long tail, long eyelashes, stubby legs and stubby toes. The front three toes are fused together near the base.

They have white belly, grey neck, and black back plumage with abundant white spots and stripes. The neck has gray spots and the chest is lightly striated with black. Southern yellow-billed hornbills have no plumage pigmentation save for melanin, which can only produce shades of black and white. The eyes are usually yellow, though brown has also been seen. The skin around the eyes and in the malar stripe is pinkish. The related eastern yellow-billed hornbill from north-eastern Africa has blackish skin around the eyes.

== Distribution and habitat ==
These birds are near endemic to the dry savannas of southern Africa, where they can be found across all longitudes, from Angola and Namibia in the west to Mozambique and KwaZulu-Natal in the east, including Botswana, Zimbabwe and northern South Africa.

The southern yellow-billed hornbill lives mostly in the dry, open savannas, but they are also very partial to woodlands when they can find them. When in woodlands, they seem to prefer acacia and broadleaved woodlands. The highest reported concentration of southern yellow-billed hornbill is in open mopane scrub.

== Behaviour ==
The southern yellow-billed hornbill is active during morning, day and evening. At night, it will sleep high in a tree so it won't be preyed on. They can be found alone, in couples or in small groups. They generally tend to be loners unless it is breeding season, nesting season or if there is local migration during dry season.

The southern yellow-billed hornbill is often seen searching for food on the ground or in shrubs. It will not dig the ground, but it will overturn debris to find insects. It can also be seen pursuing insects by hopping heavily after it.

They are generally sedentary and they will defend their territories with elaborate displays. However, during the dry season, they will sometimes range widely in order to find food. Couples are usually monogamous and have a clear division of labour between males and females.

They have been known to live for up to 20 years in captivity, though their longevity in the wild remains unknown.

== Flight ==
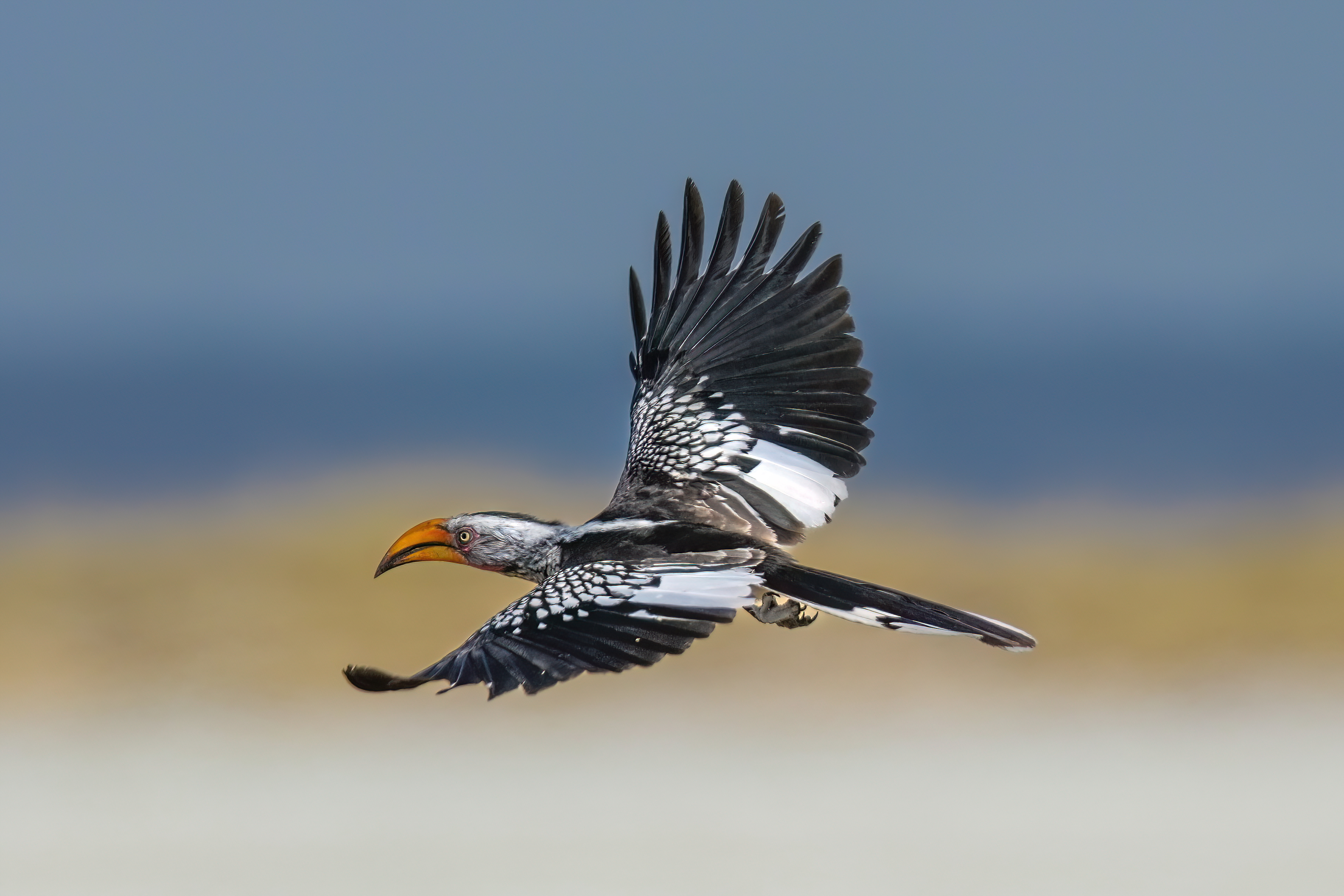
Male in flight in Etosha National Park, Namibia

The southern yellow-billed hornbill flies powerfully. It alternates short gliding periods with heavy wing beats. The southern yellow-billed hornbill lacks the underwing coverts which enhances the flow of air when it flies.

== Vocalization ==
Southern yellow-billed hornbills have a piercing cry. However it has a wide variety of sounds it can make such as, whistling, grunting and caqueting. They will use their loud calls to either delimit their territory or for long-distance communication. Like other Tockus, they will often accompany their calls with conspicuous physical displays.

== Diet ==
Southern yellow-billed hornbill eats mostly arthropods, particularly termites, beetles, larvae (beetles and termites), grasshoppers and caterpillars. It has also been seen eating centipedes and scorpions. They will occasionally eat small mammals when they can. To complete the diet, they will regularly eat berries, fruits, nuts and eggs from other species.

Southern yellow-billed hornbill use their beaks as a pair of forceps. They will grasp their food between the tips and then toss it back in their throat where the short, stubby tongue will assist in swallowing the food. The inner cutting edges of the beak are serrated to facilitate the crushing and fragmentation of food. Most of the food is picked from the ground or from low vegetation. Their diet has some overlap with that of the southern ground hornbill .

== Reproduction ==
Breeding season starts when the first autumn rain falls. The breeding season goes from September to march with the egg-laying peak between October and December. Eggs are laid during the wet season so different areas will have different peaks according to the local rainy season. For example, the peak generally occurs from November to February in the eastern regions and from December to March in the northwest regions of the southern yellow-billed hornbill's range. These peaks coincide with the peak rainfall of the year.

Young birds become sexually mature when they are one year old. However, before the actual breeding is done, there is the courtship feeding of females, mutual preening, copulation and prospecting of nests sites that must be done.

Once the male southern yellow-billed hornbill has mated, it will stay with his mate and establish a territory that it will defend. The nests are in natural cavities in trees, cliffs or earth banks between 1 and 12 meters from the ground. The male then proceeds to bring bark, leaves and grass which will be put on the bottom of the nest. During this time, the female will seal herself inside the nest by blocking the entry with a wall made from her droppings and food remains. The male will help by bringing mud for her to work with.

The only opening left is a vertical slit from the top to the bottom. The male passes the food through the slit with his beak. The female and chick droppings are forcibly expelled through the slit as well. The vertical slit provides good air circulation through convection and when coupled with the wooden walls, it provides a good insulation.

Nests usually contain 2-6 eggs and take about 24 days to hatch. The eggs are white, oval and have finely pitted shells. The chicks are born naked and with pink skin. They and the female are fed by the male who brings back food and drops it through the slit. Most nests will also have a long escape tunnel in case a predator breaks in the nest to eat them.

Taking advantage of the fact that she is imprisoned; the female will shed all of her flight and tail feathers simultaneously and regrow them during the time she stays with the chicks. Once the chicks are half-grown, the female will break out of the nest in order to help the male. The chicks will rebuild the wall themselves and continue to be fed through the slits by the parents. Once the chicks are fully grown, they will break out of the nest and start flying.

== Interactions with humans ==
Hornbills have a unique look, so many cultures give them an important place in their beliefs. Some indigenous tribes revere hornbills as sacred beings that must not be harmed. Others will hunt them for food, to use them in the confection of traditional medicine or to use them in rituals.

== Gallery ==
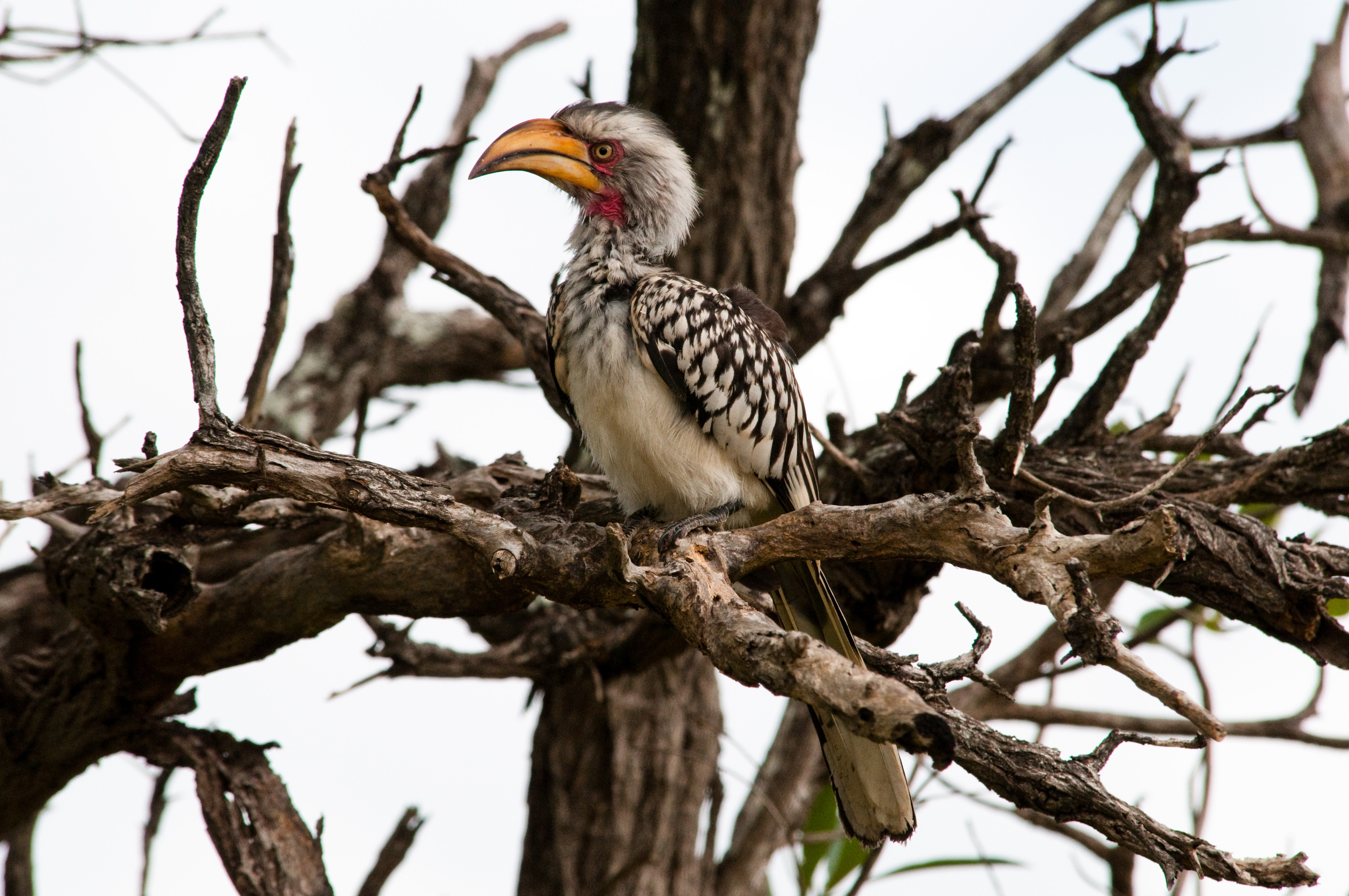
Immature bird at Kruger Park, South Africa

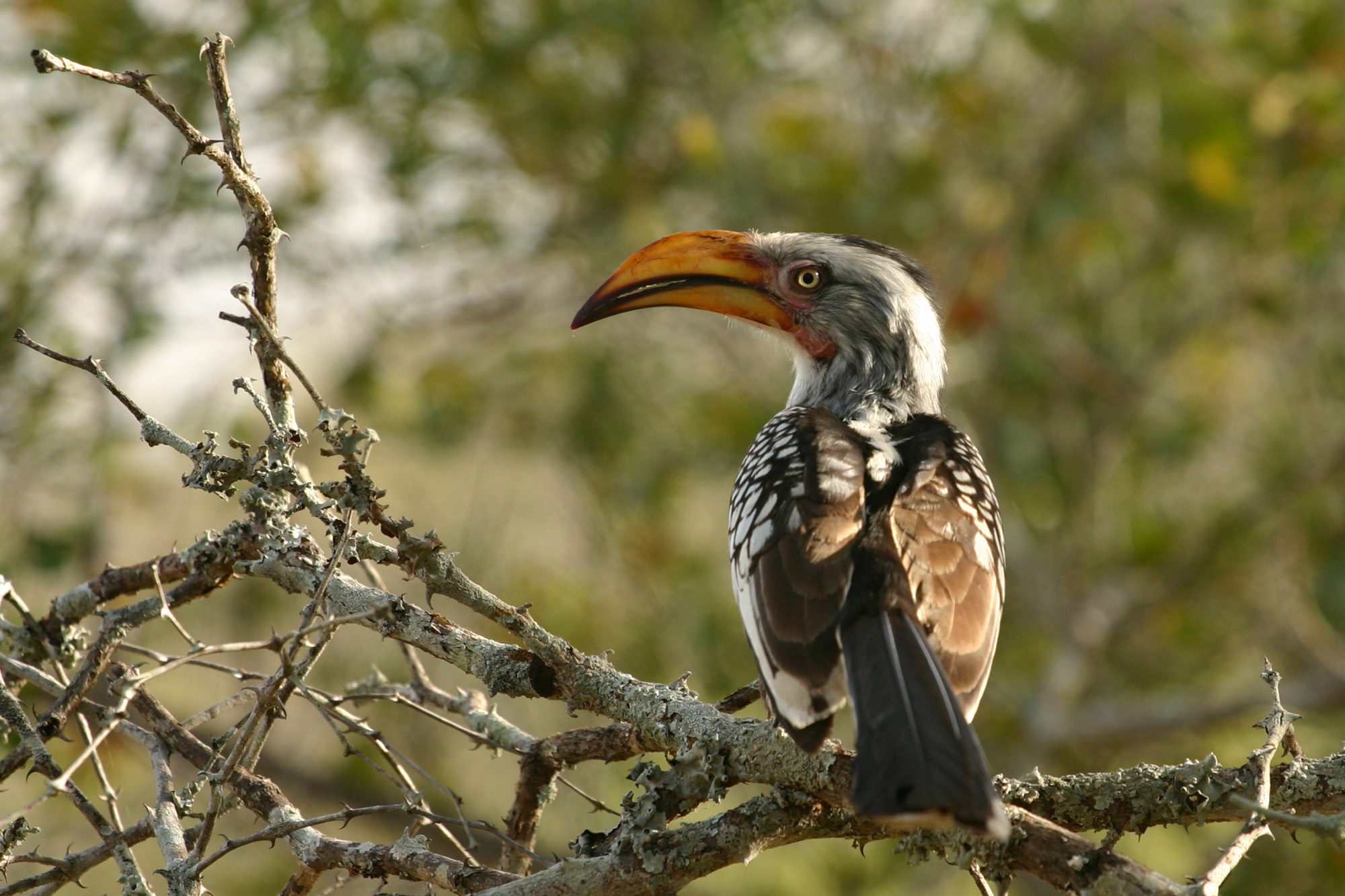
Adult female northern Sabi Sand, South Africa

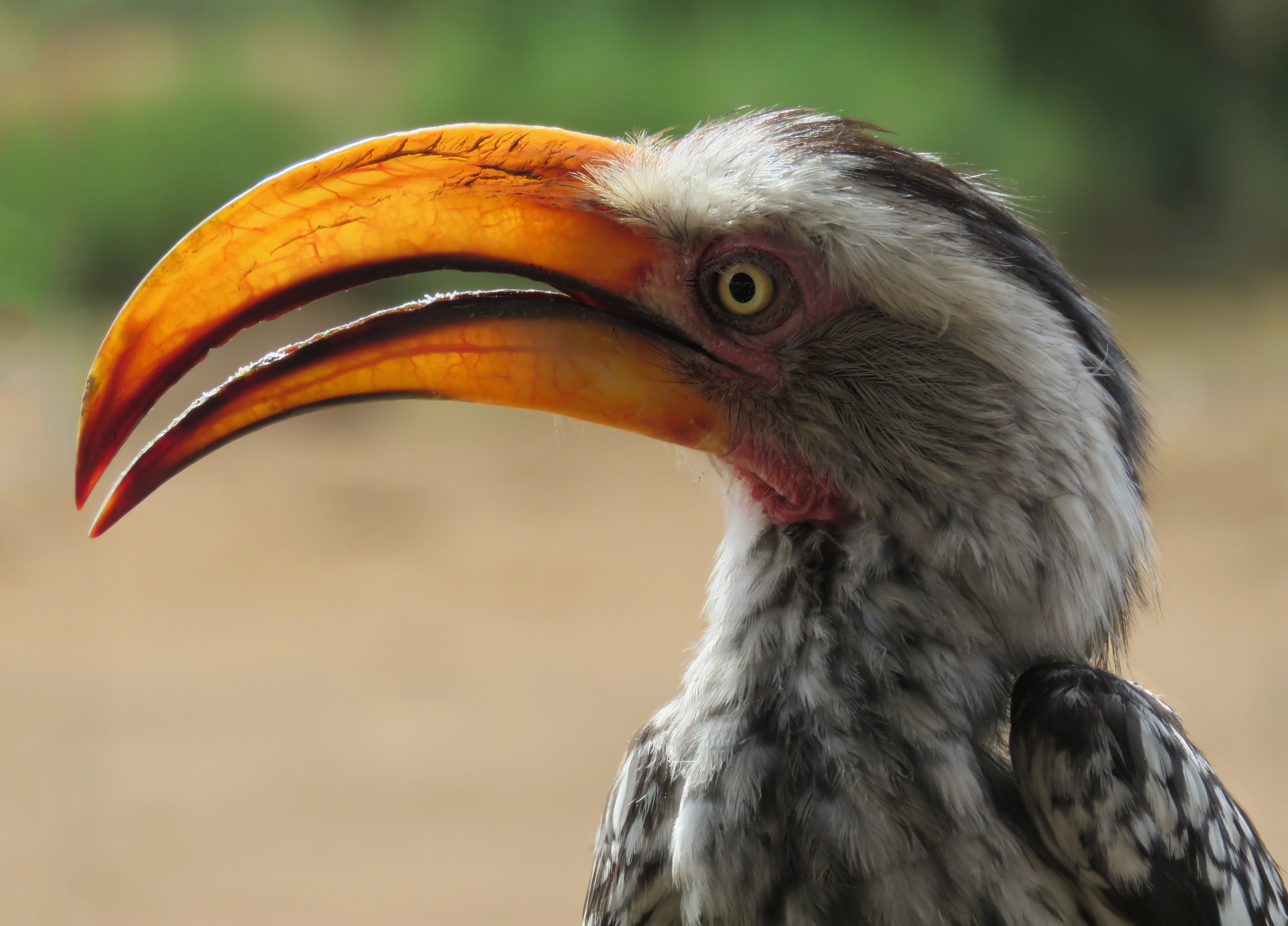
Backlit bill of male in Pilanesberg, S. Africa

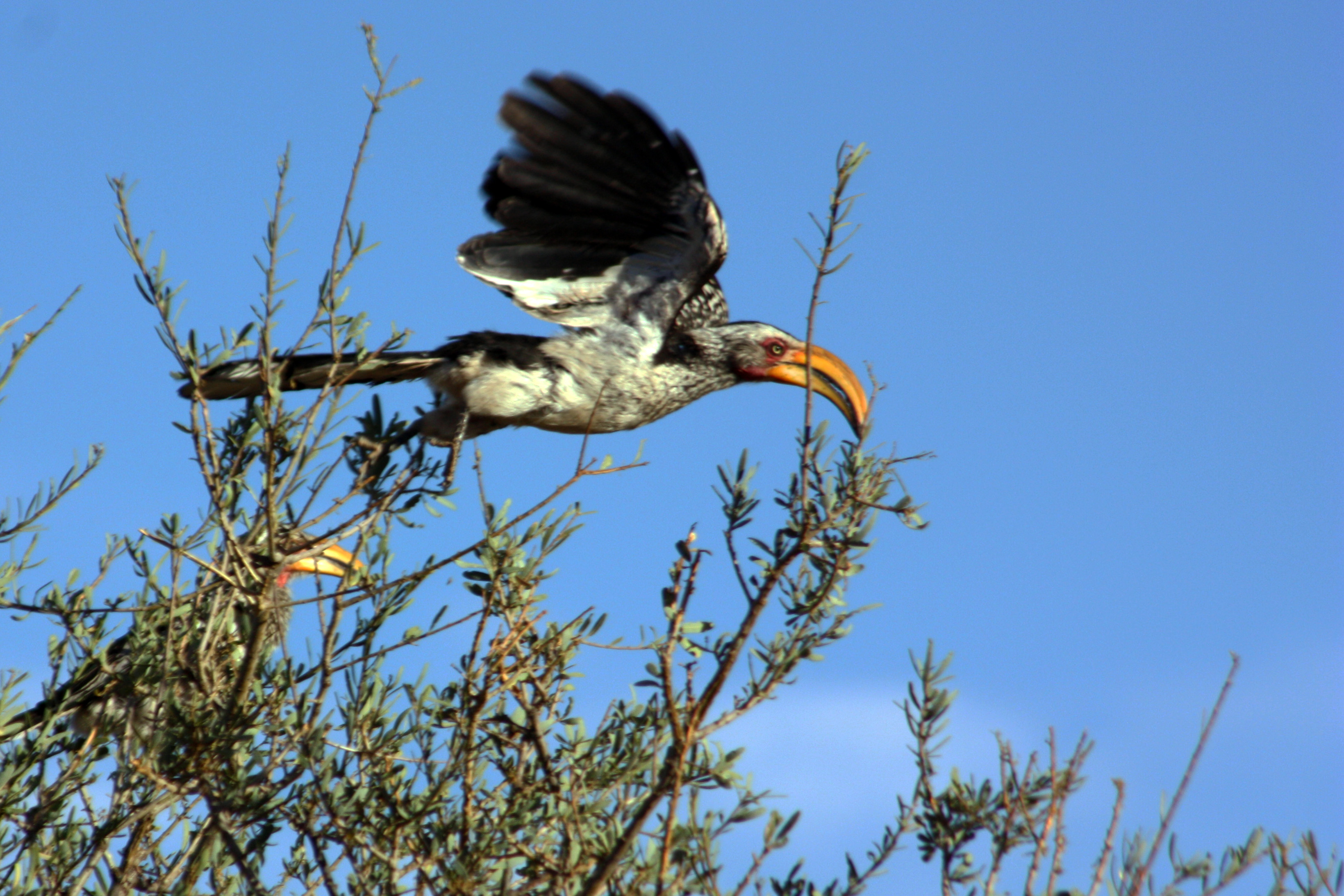
In flight, Tswalu Kalahari Reserve, South Africa

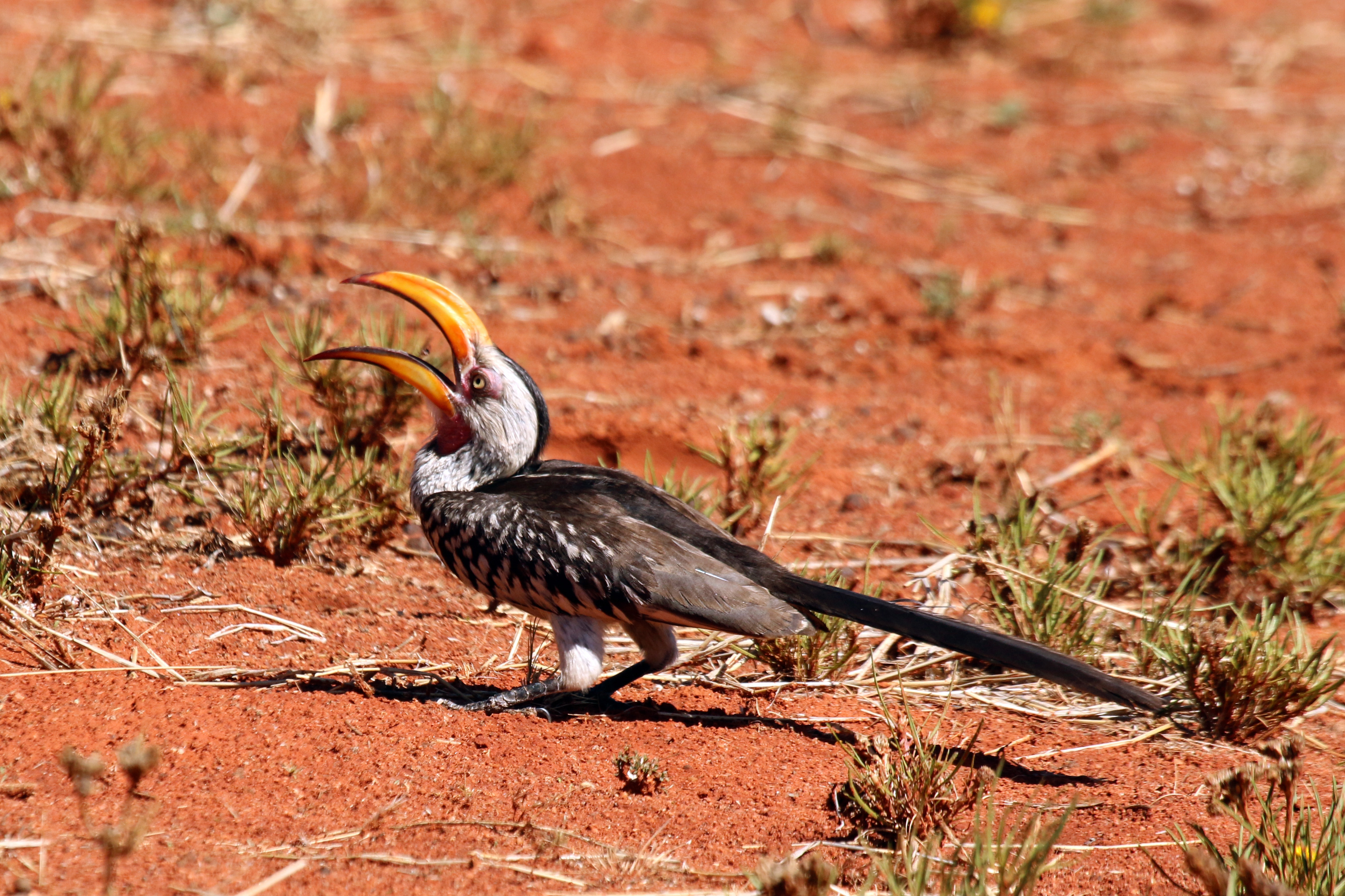
Tossing small food item for swallowing, Tswalu

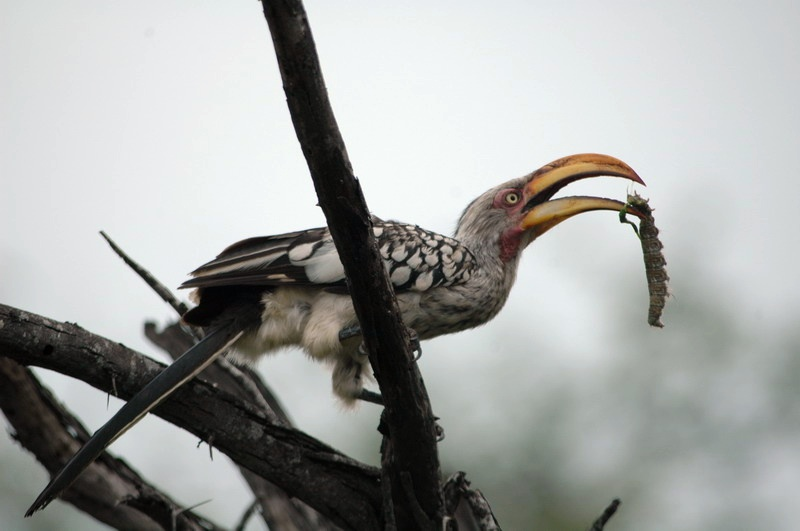
With caterpillar prey, eastern South Africa

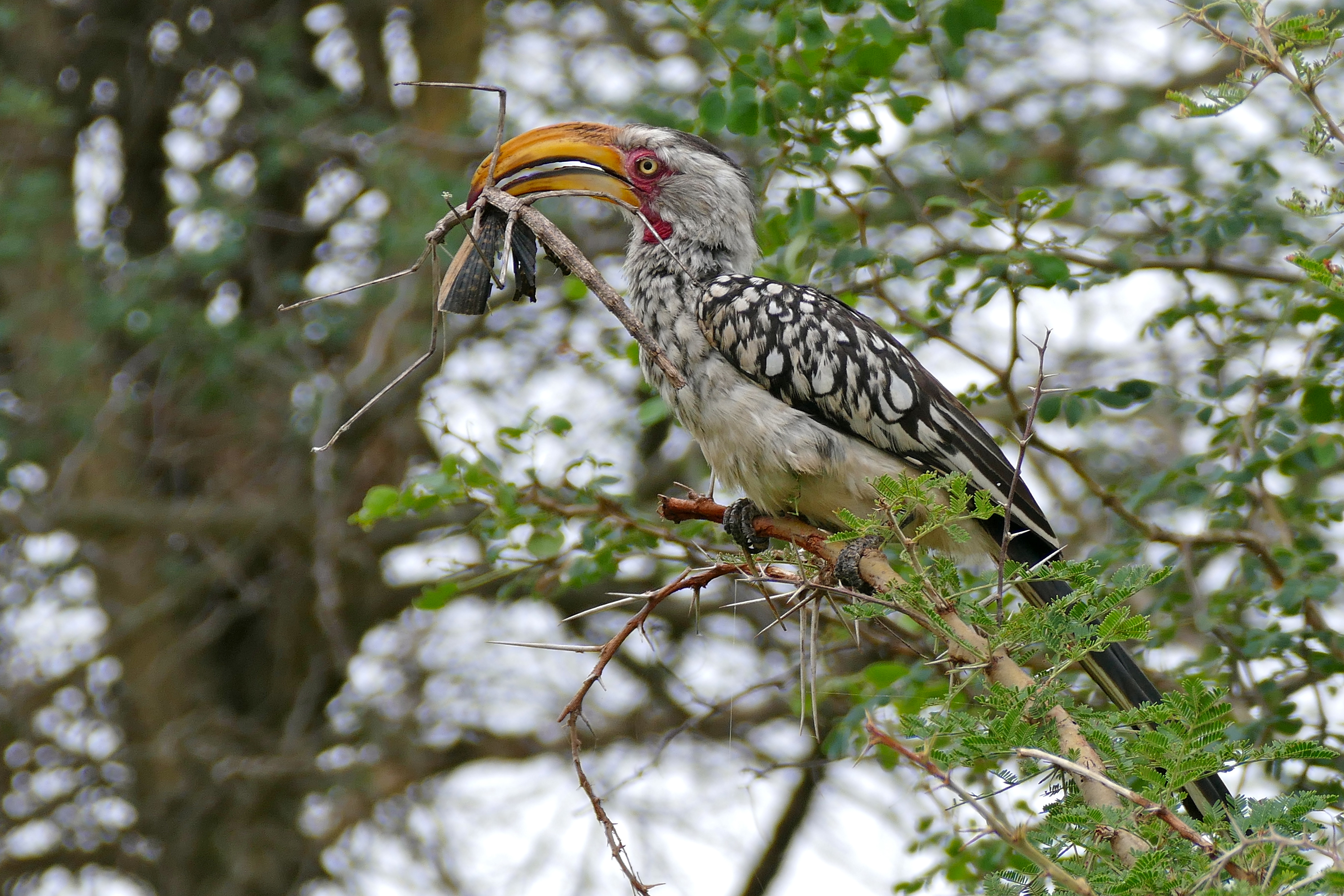
With stick insect prey, Kruger Park

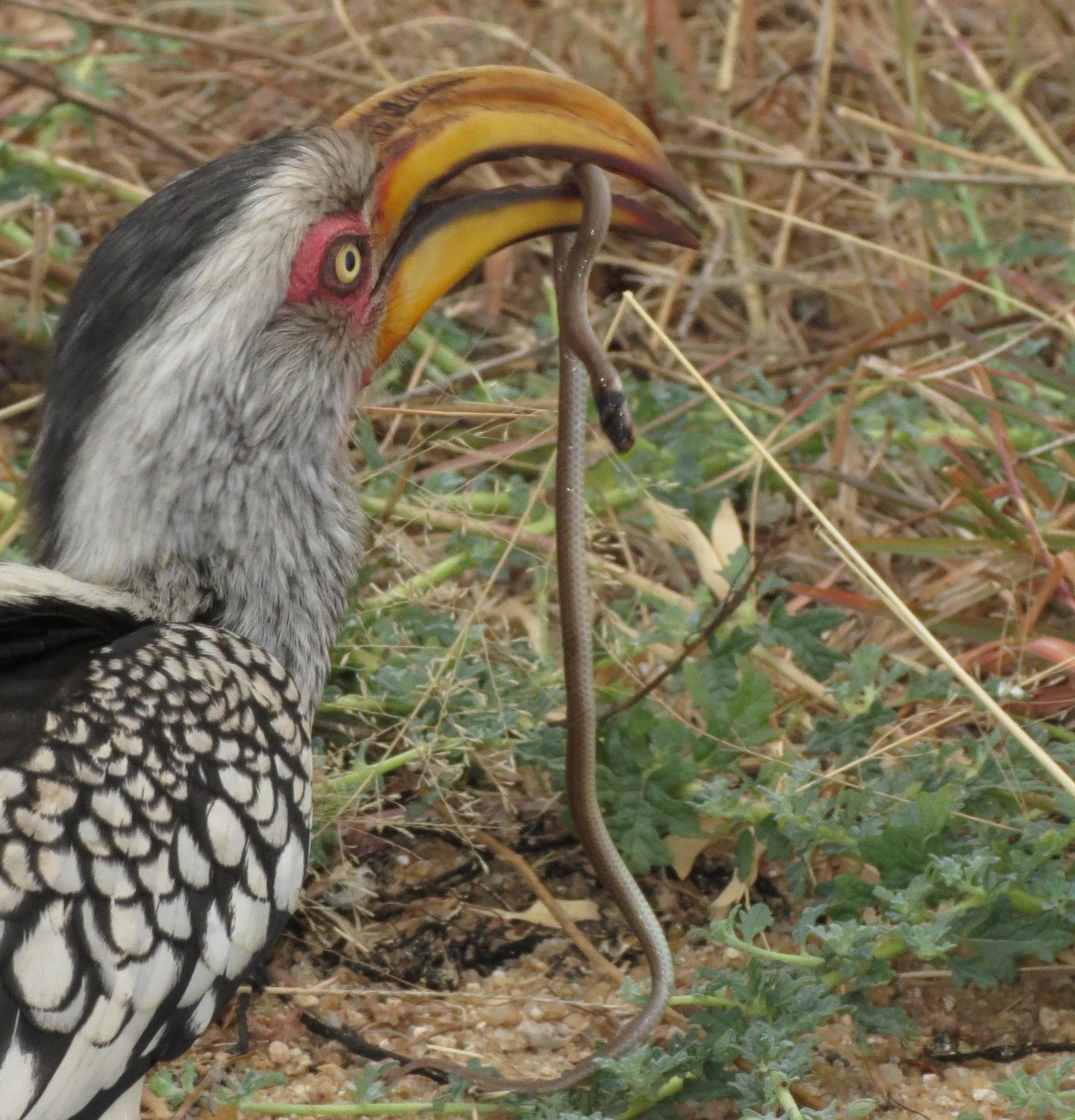
With small snake prey, Kruger Park

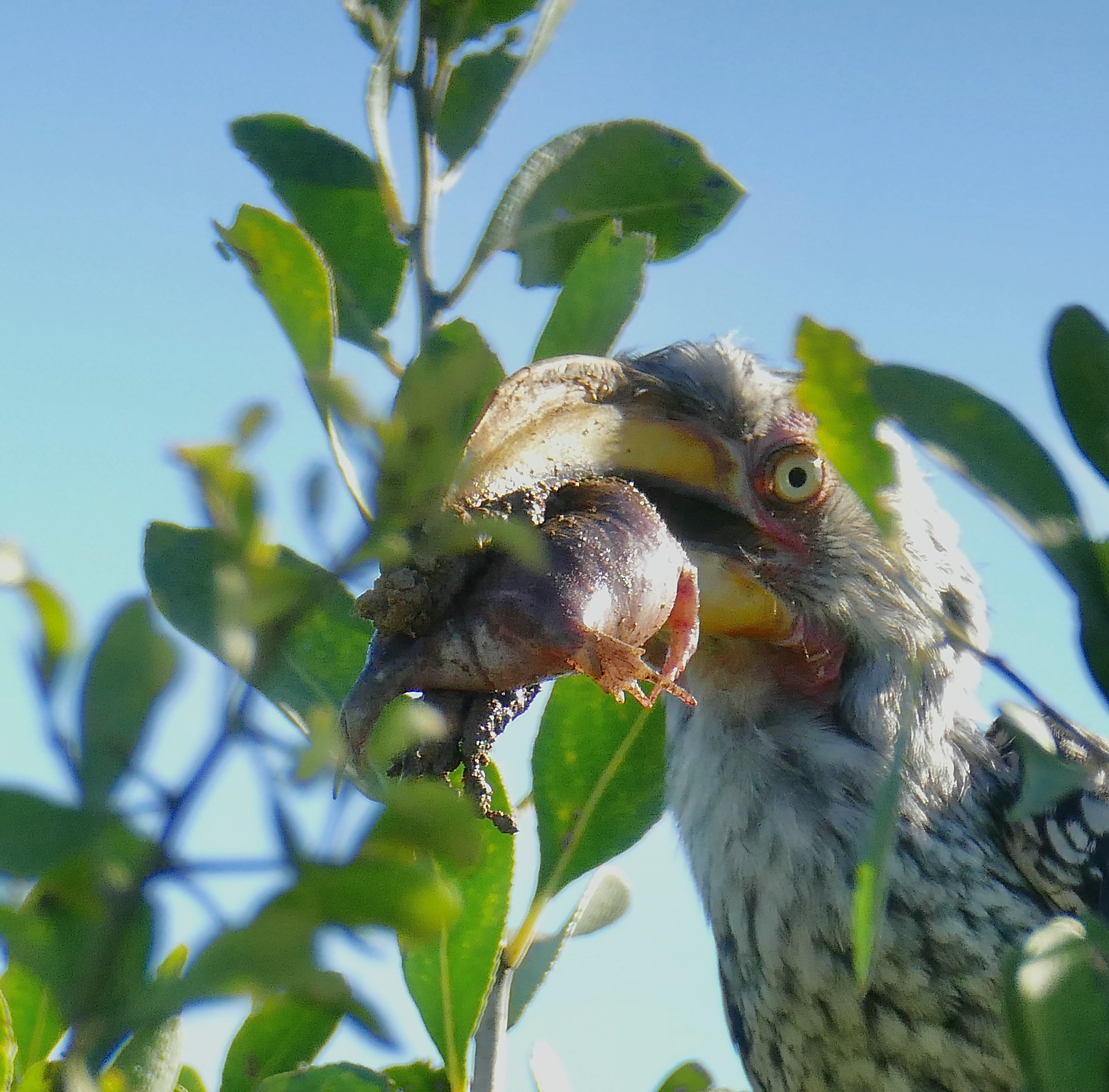
With rain frog prey, Kruger Park

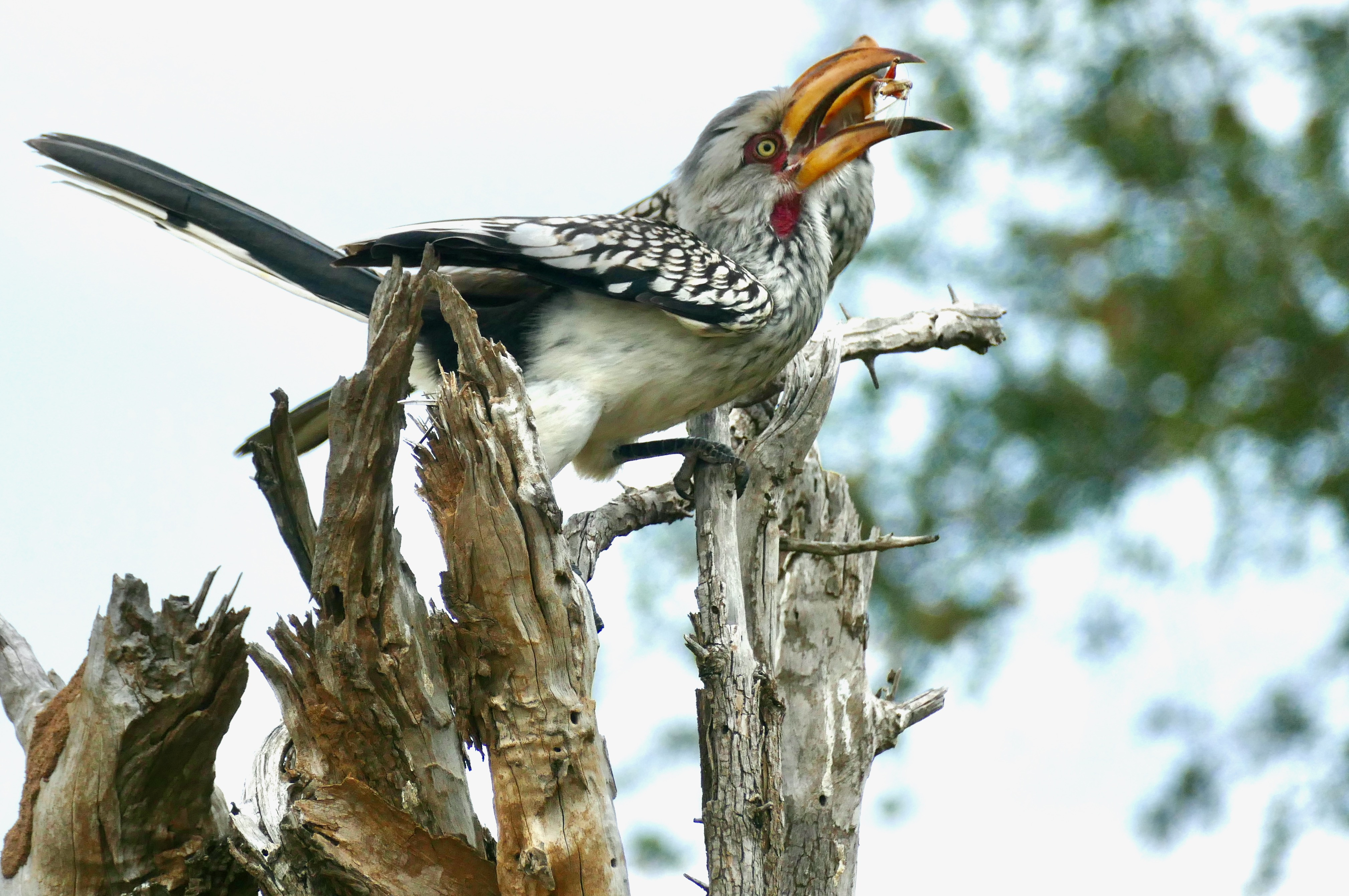
Courtship feeding in Kruger Park

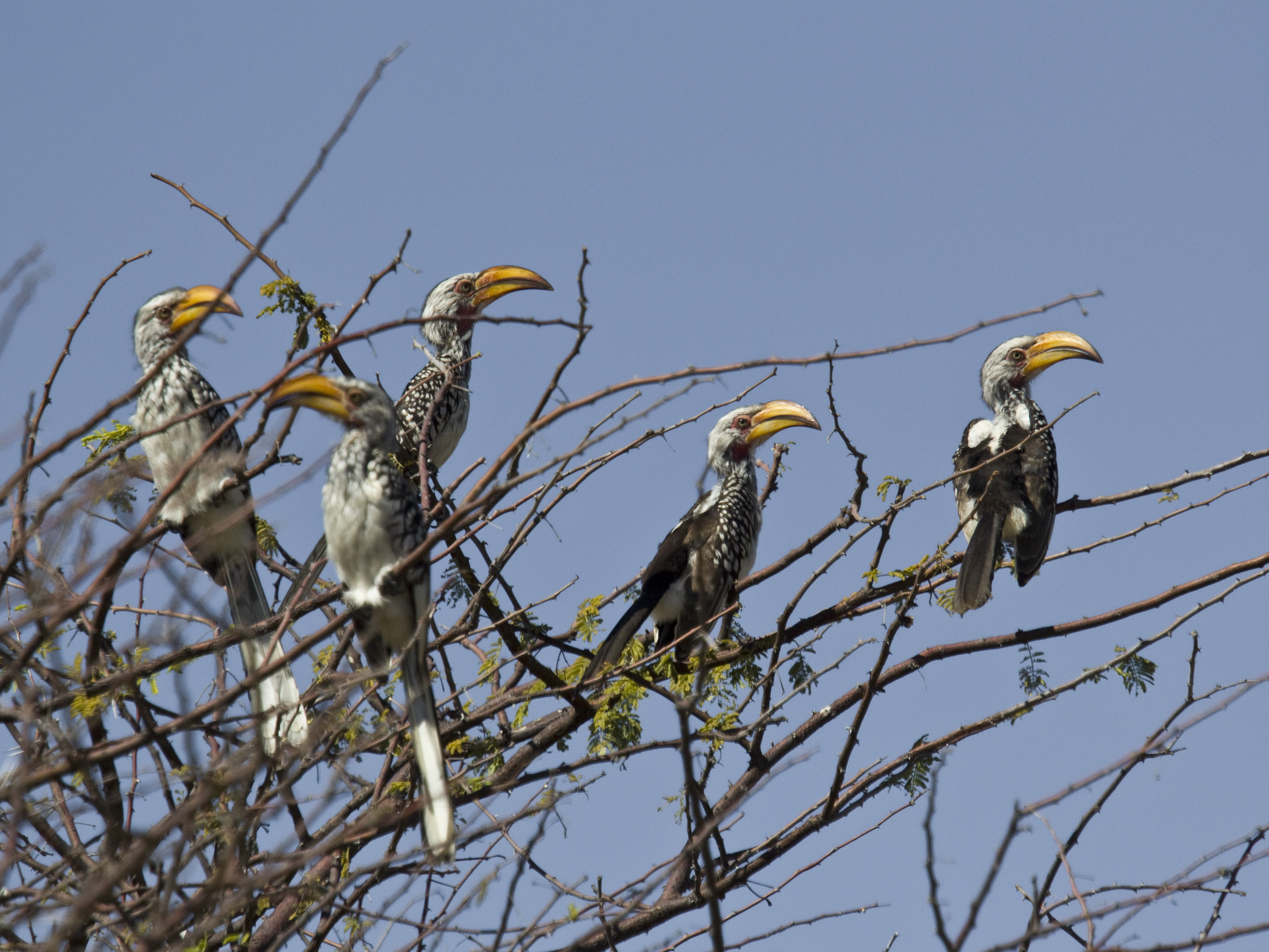
Roving party in the non-breeding season, Etosha

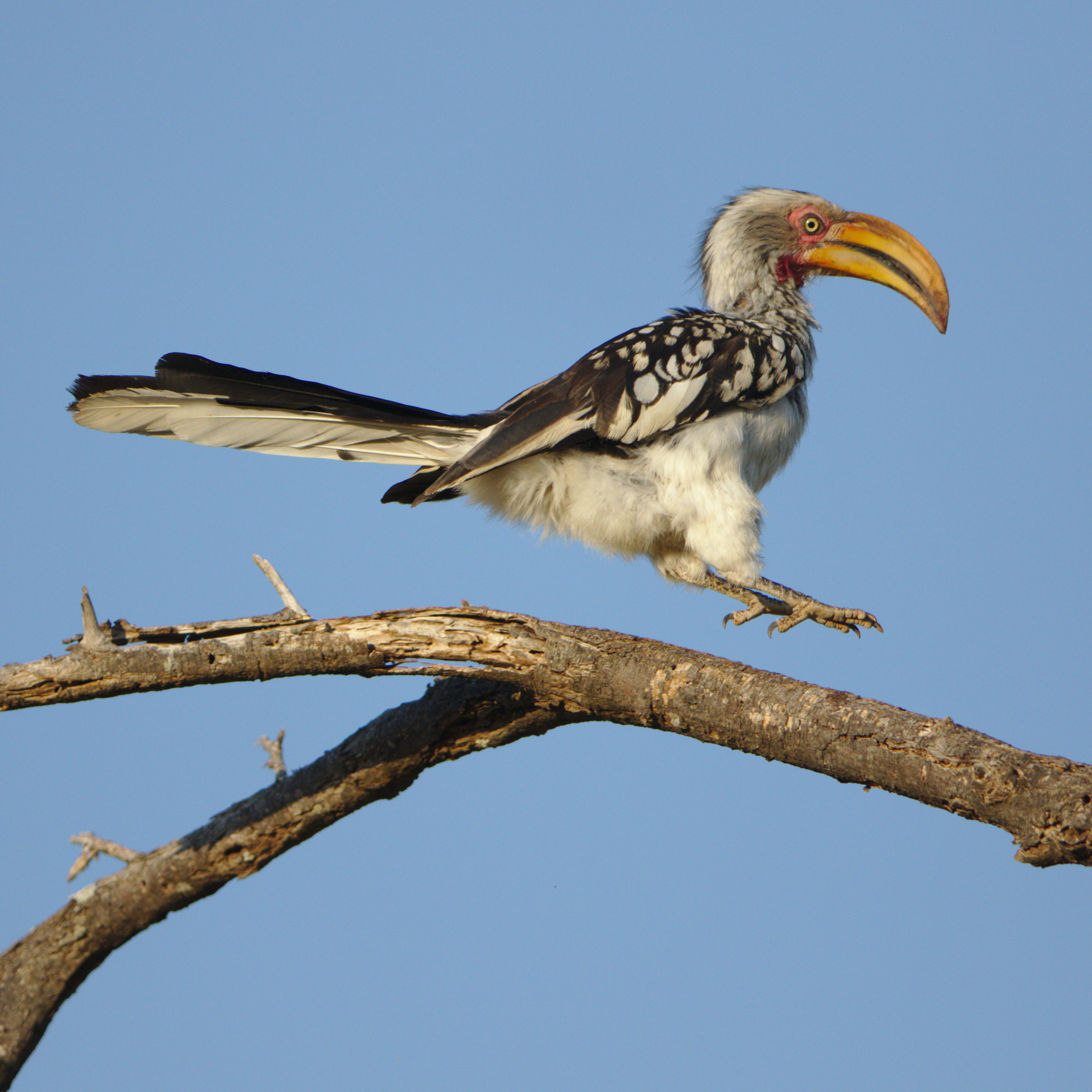
Hopping gait on tree limb, Marakele
