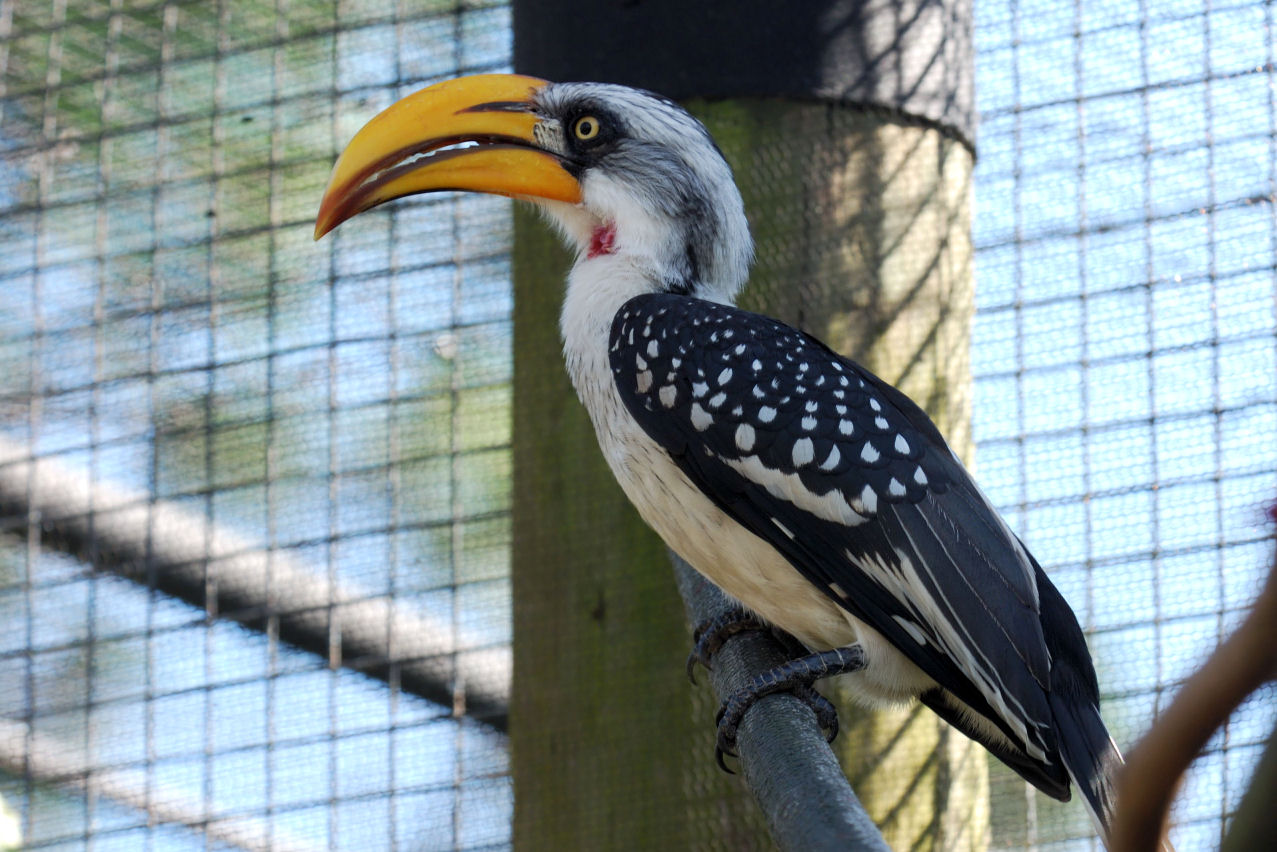
- Male
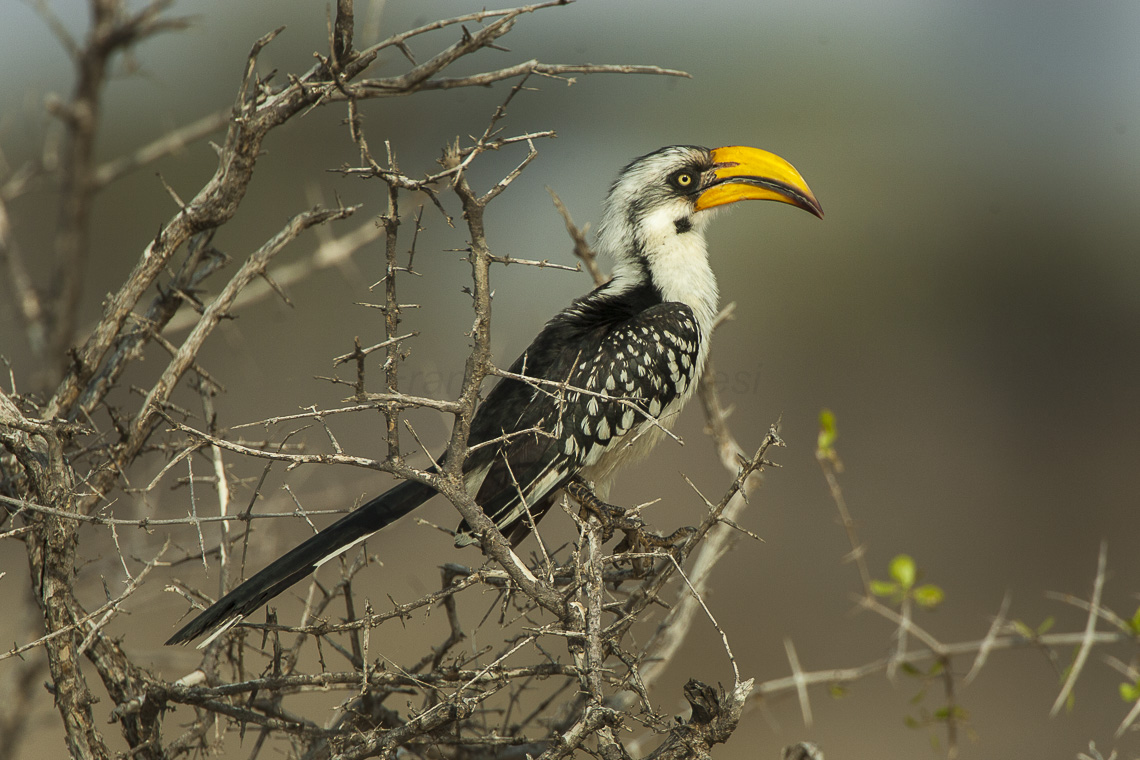
- Female

Conservation status
- Least Concern (IUCN 3.1)

Scientific classification
- Kingdom: Animalia
- Phylum: Chordata
- Class: Aves
- Order: Bucerotiformes
- Family: Bucerotidae
- Genus: Tockus
- Species: T. flavirostris

Binomial name
- Tockus flavirostris (Rüppell, 1835)
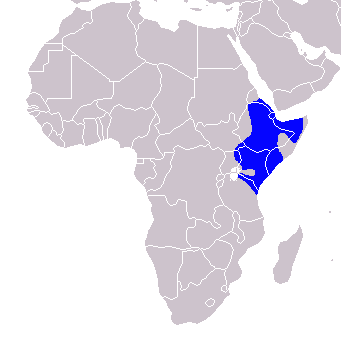
- approximate distribution

= Eastern yellow-billed hornbill =

Species of bird

The Eastern yellow-billed hornbill (Tockus flavirostris), also known as the northern yellow-billed hornbill, is a species of hornbill in the family Bucerotidae. It is found in Djibouti, Eritrea, Ethiopia, Kenya, Somaliland, South Sudan, Tanzania, and Uganda. It resembles the southern yellow-billed hornbill, but has blackish (not pinkish) skin around the eyes. This bird is currently least concern in the IUCN Red List, their major threats being the loss of large trees and degradation of the forest and grassland habitats, losing their drought-resistant vegetations and increasing drought risks driven by climate change.

== Description ==
Similar to other hornbills, the eastern yellow-billed hornbill has a large, down-curved, banana shaped bill. It has a reduced casque extending to the tip of its large orange-yellow beak, unlike other hornbills which have an extended large casque on their heads. It is a small hornbill, its height being around 40 cm (16 in), and it has a pied plumage which is black and white, with white underparts, black wing coverts spotted in white and a white outer tail. One differentiating factor from the southern yellow-billed hornbill is its black skin around its eye, compared to the reddish skin in the southern species. Another characteristic that differentiates is the colour of the throat of the males, being pink bare skin on the eastern species, compares to a more dusky tone for the southern species.

=== Sexual dimorphism ===
Like many other birds, the eastern yellow-billed hornbill shows sexual dimorphism, in size, bill shape and skin color. The males weigh usually around 225 to 275 g (7.9 to 9.7 oz), while the females weigh 170–191 g (6.0–6.7 oz). The males have a broad bill that has a low casque which extends to the tip, while females have smaller bills and a shorter casque. The females have black skin on the throat, while males have pink throat skin that can inflate while calling during the breeding season. The juveniles are similar than adults in colours but have brown spots on their wing coverts and a shorter duller bill.

== Habitat and distribution ==
The easteren yellow-billed hornbill has a wide range of habitat tolerance, but prefers dry savannas, such as thorn savannahs. It does not show any preference for a particular tree or grass cover and density, and shows varying densities of vegetation within its suitable habitat. It normally inhabits habitats at elevations below 1,400 m (4,600 ft), living in open thornbush savannah and Commiphora woodlands. It is resident to those habitats since it is non-migratory, but move locally closer together within its range in the dry season, and back outwards in the wet season. It is distributed in many countries of mid-eastern Africa, with most of the sightings being in Kenya, Uganda, and Tanzania. It can also be seen in Eritrea, Ethiopia, Djibouti and Somalia. Baobabs have been shown to be home to many hornbill species, nesting in holes. The females also uses them as protection against their main predators, which are snakes, by sealing themselves inside the baobab holes before incubation.

== Behaviour ==
=== Nesting ===
The eastern yellow-billed hornbill, similar to many other species of hornbill, uses a sealing technique in order to protect its offspring. Females will choose their nest at about 1.5 to 4.5 m (4 ft 11 in to 14 ft 9 in) high in a tree or a rock cavity and will start to seal the opening with mud while still outside the tree cavity. After enclosing themselves in the tree cavity, they will use their own droppings to seal themselves inside the cavity. When the seal is dried, it becomes hard and camouflages where the nest is situated on the tree or rock. The female, enclosed in the nest for the next 40 to 50 days, will molt their flight feathers such as their retrices (tail feathers) and their remiges (wing feathers) early on in the incubation period. This behaviour is an adaptation, since molting birds are vulnerable, and the enclosed space will protect them from predators.

The male is responsible, during the entirety of the incubation period and the majority of the chick developement, for feeding the female and the chicks, by a small slit in the tree cavity. The male will bring food piece by piece to the female via the slit, while she incubates the clutch of 2-3 eggs. When the space in the nest cavity becomes crowded and the chicks approach their full development, the female will break out of the seal using their strong beak. The chicks then will reseal the nest cavity at the best of their abilities, often not as well executed as the female, and continue their development until they are ready to fledge. This technique is dependent on the male for feeding, since the male's survival is essential for the female and chicks survival.

=== Diet and foraging ===
The eastern yellow-billed hornbill is an opportunistic feeder that forages on the ground looking for a variety of preys, such as insects, spiders, scorpions, and small vertebrates, as well as seeds and fruits. In order to find those, it will dig into dead wood to harvest beetles and larvae, flip around pebbles and leaf litter with its large beak to find grasshoppers, crickets, and termites on the ground. When insects become scarce during drier seasons, it relies on fruits and seeds from different genera, such as Commiphora and Boscia, which are drought-tolerant trees and shrubs native to semi arid and arid woodlands of Africa.

It also has a mutualistic relationship with the common dwarf mongoose (Helogale parvula), for foraging efficiently. Both species will wait until the other arrives to the site before starting foraging. This relationship is beneficial for the bird as it is able to detect the prey more easily than it would without the help of the mongoose, relying on the mongoose's sense of smell to locate prey hidden under logs and stones, with the mongoose benefitting from the bird's keen eyesight to find prey disturbed by the mongoose's movements through the grass.

=== Vocalisation ===
The eastern yellow-billed hornbill makes a series of low pitched cackling laughs that often go up in a crescendo. The laugh sounds like "roh-roh-roh-roh-roh-roh-RAH-RAH-RAH-RAH" and is similar to that of the southern yellow-billed hornbill (Tockus leucomelas), which sounds more high-pitched and is heard like "woh-woh-woh-woh-woh-woh-WAH-WAH-WAH-WAH". It is also known to share a mutualistic vocalisation with the common dwarf mongoose and another species of hornbill, Von der Decken's hornbill (Tockus deckeni), alerting these other species of the presence of a common predator by emitting a slow, continuous, and rythmic "wok-wok-wok" call after flying away rapidly towards the trees, by which the other species respond by a loud squawks and flight from the area. The eastern yellow-billed hornbill and one other species, the black-and-white-casqued hornbill (Bycanistes subcylindricus) have been recorded doing group vocalisations as well. For Tockus flavirostris, a pair would perch together in an open woodland and call simultaneously, as a duet. Both birds call with two different vocalisations, one at higher pitch of 0.55 kHz , while the other at lower pitch of 0.5 kHz. During this prolonged series of call, notes sound like a "tock-tock-tocke-tocke", the bird singing at higher-pitch produces 11 notes, as the other birds simultaneously produces 10 lower-pitch notes.
