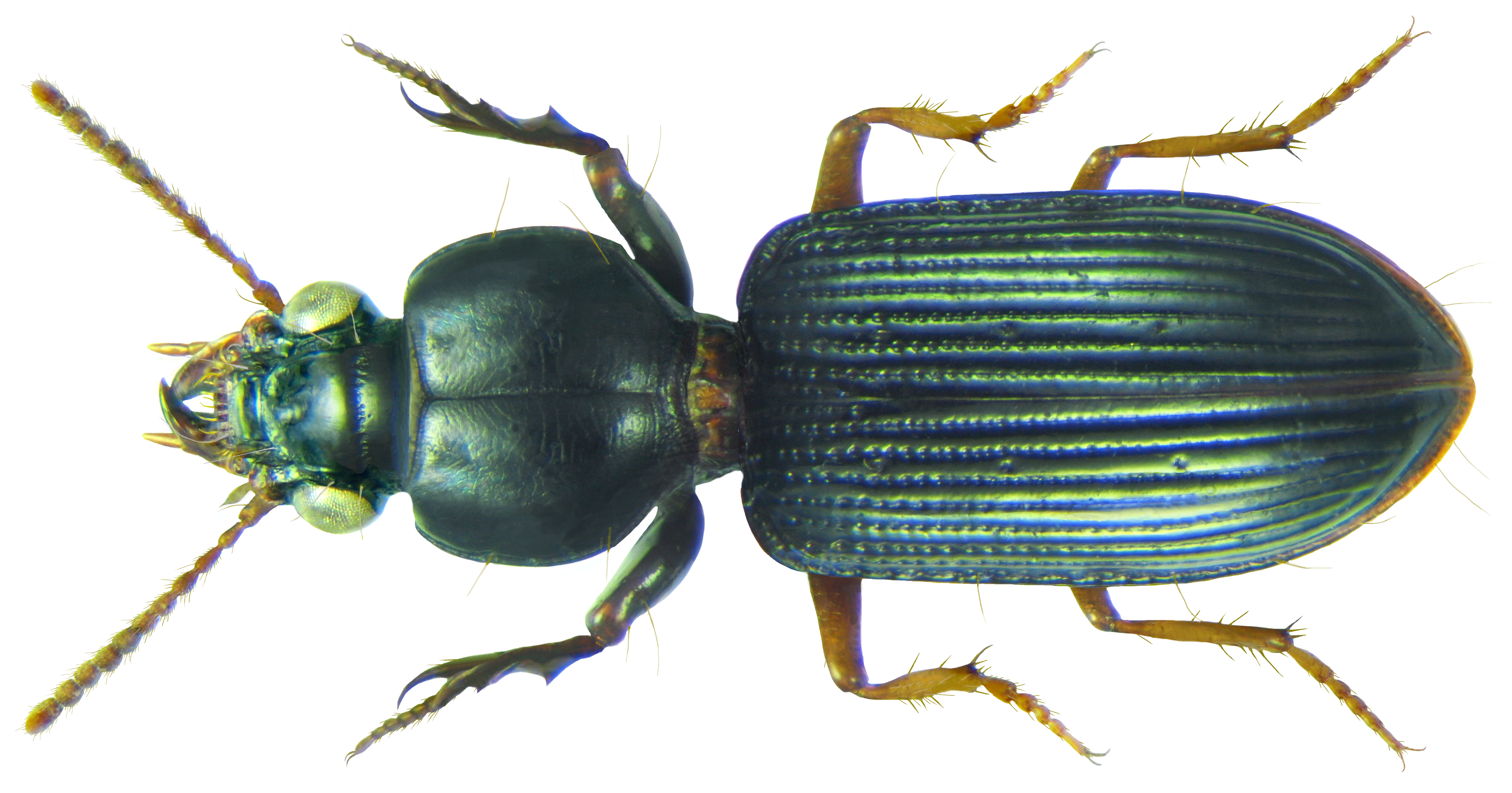
- Family: Carabidae Size: 6,1 mm Location: India, South Goa, Distr. Canacona, Raj Baga Beach leg. U.Schmidt, 16.-29.XI.2010; det. P.Bulirsch, 2011

Scientific classification
- Domain: Eukaryota
- Kingdom: Animalia
- Phylum: Arthropoda
- Class: Insecta
- Order: Coleoptera
- Suborder: Adephaga
- Family: Carabidae
- Genus: Clivina
- Species: C. tranquebarica

Binomial name
- Clivina tranquebarica Bonelli, 1813

= Clivina tranquebarica =

Species of beetle

Clivina tranquebarica is a species of ground beetle in the subfamily Scaritinae. It was described by Bonelli in 1813.
