= Nebria castanea =

Scientific classification
- Domain: Eukaryota
- Kingdom: Animalia
- Phylum: Arthropoda
- Class: Insecta
- Order: Coleoptera
- Suborder: Adephaga
- Family: Carabidae
- Genus: Nebria
- Species: N. castanea

Binomial name
- Nebria castanea Bonelli, 1810

Species of beetle

Nebria castanea is a species of ground beetle from Nebriinae family that can be found in Austria, France, Germany, Italy, and Switzerland.
