= Bonelli's warbler =

Bonelli's warbler can refer to either of two bird species, formerly regarded as conspecific:

- Western Bonelli's warbler, Phylloscopus bonelli
- Eastern Bonelli's warbler, Phylloscopus orientalis
