= Nebria tibialis =

Scientific classification
- Kingdom: Animalia
- Phylum: Arthropoda
- Clade: Pancrustacea
- Class: Insecta
- Order: Coleoptera
- Suborder: Adephaga
- Family: Carabidae
- Genus: Nebria
- Species: N. tibialis

Binomial name
- Nebria tibialis (Bonelli), 1810

Species of beetle

Nebria tibialis is a species of ground beetle in the Nebriinae subfamily that is endemic to Italy.

== Subspecies ==
The species have 3 subspecies all of which are endemic to Italy:

- Nebria tibialis doderoi Banninger, 1924
- Nebria tibialis subcontracta K. Daniel & J. Daniel, 1891
- Nebria tibialis tibialis Bonelli, 1810
