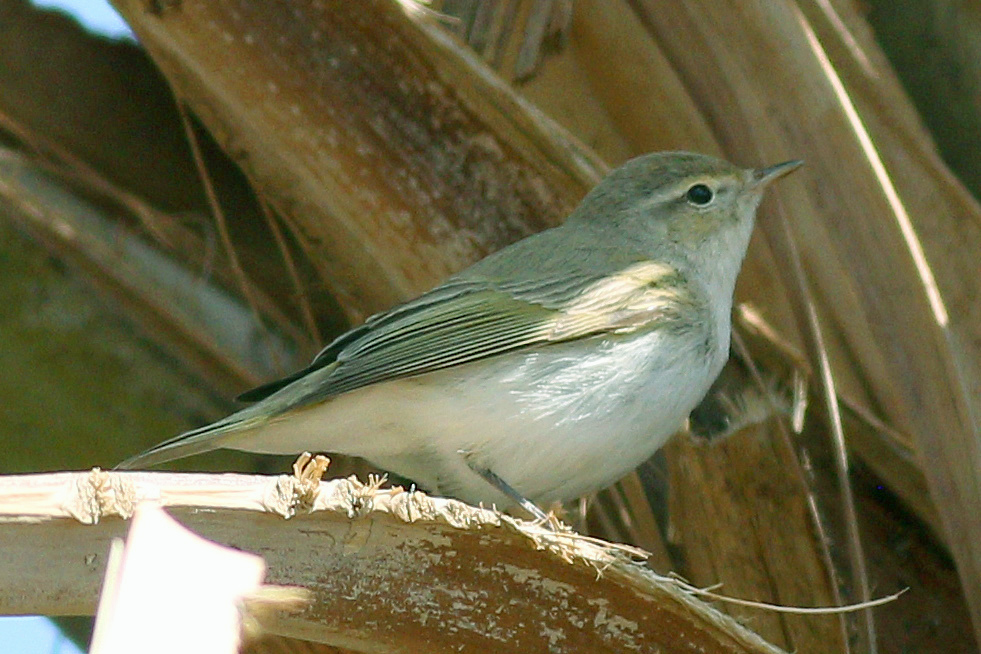
- In Israel

Conservation status
- Least Concern (IUCN 3.1)

Scientific classification
- Kingdom: Animalia
- Phylum: Chordata
- Class: Aves
- Order: Passeriformes
- Family: Phylloscopidae
- Genus: Phylloscopus
- Species: P. orientalis

Binomial name
- Phylloscopus orientalis (Brehm, 1855)

= Eastern Bonelli's warbler =

Species of bird

The eastern Bonelli's warbler (Phylloscopus orientalis), sometimes known as the Balkan warbler, is a warbler in the leaf warbler genus Phylloscopus. It was formerly regarded as the eastern subspecies of a wider "Bonelli's warbler" species, but as a result of modern taxonomic developments, they are now usually considered to be two species:

- Western Bonelli's warbler, Phylloscopus bonelli, which breeds in southwest Europe and north Africa
- Eastern Bonelli's warbler, Phylloscopus orientalis, which breeds in southeast Europe and Asia Minor

The breeding ranges of the two species do not overlap; while their appearance and songs are very similar, the calls are completely different (see below). They also show marked difference in mtDNA sequence.

The species is migratory, wintering in sub-Saharan Africa. It is a rare vagrant in Northern Europe.

Eastern Bonelli's warbler is a small passerine bird, found in forest and woodland. Four to six eggs are laid in a nest on the ground. Like most warblers, eastern Bonelli's is insectivorous.

It is a small warbler. The adult has a plain grey-green back, green-toned rump and wings and whitish underparts. The bill is small and pointed and the legs brown. The sexes are identical, as with most warblers.

The eastern Bonelli's warbler lacks the browner tinge to the upperparts that the western Bonelli's warbler has; it sometimes has a greenish tinge instead. The song is a fast monotone trill, only slightly different from western Bonelli's, and also some similarity to the wood warbler. The call of the eastern Bonelli's warbler is a hard chup, reminiscent of a crossbill or a house sparrow, and completely different from the disyllabic hu-it of the western Bonelli's warbler.

The genus name Phylloscopus is from Ancient Greek phullon, "leaf", and skopos, "seeker" (from skopeo, "to watch"). The specific orientalis is Latin for "eastern". The English name for this bird commemorates the Italian ornithologist Franco Andrea Bonelli.
