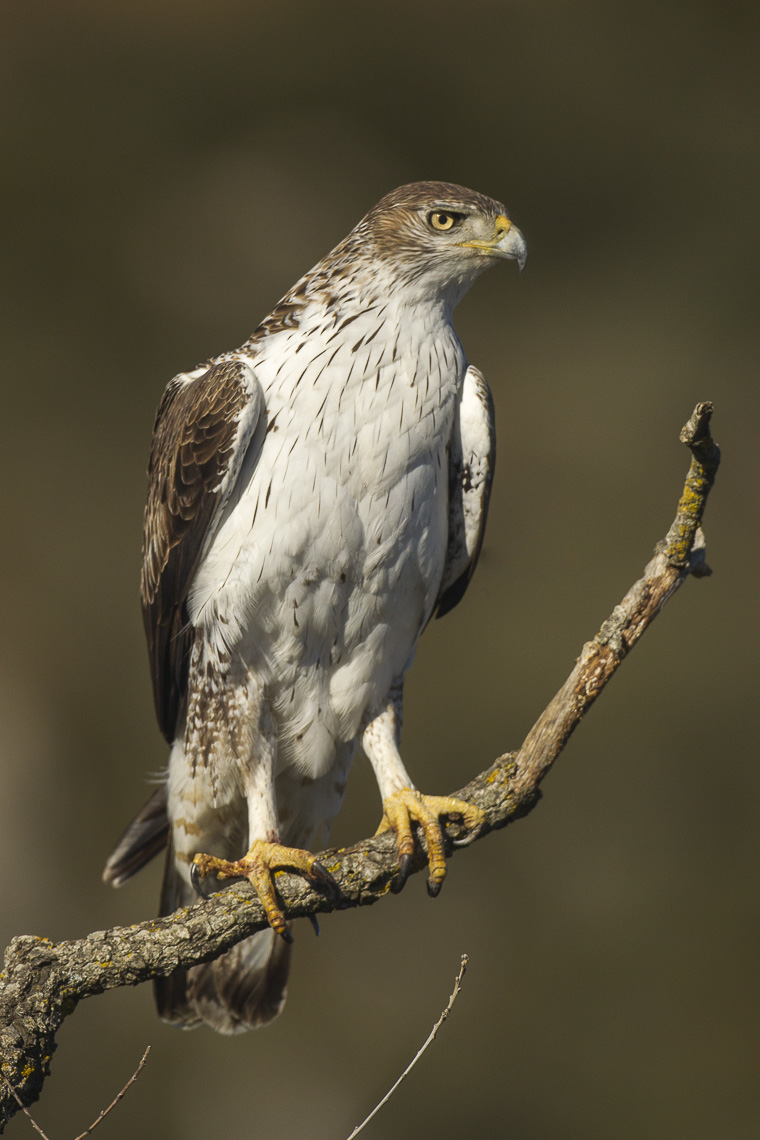
- An adult Bonelli's eagle perched in Spain

Conservation status
- Least Concern (IUCN 3.1)

Scientific classification
- Kingdom: Animalia
- Phylum: Chordata
- Class: Aves
- Order: Accipitriformes
- Family: Accipitridae
- Genus: Aquila
- Species: A. fasciata

Binomial name
- Aquila fasciata Vieillot, 1822

Subspecies
- A. f. fasciata Vieillot, 1822; A. f. renschi (Stresemann, 1932)
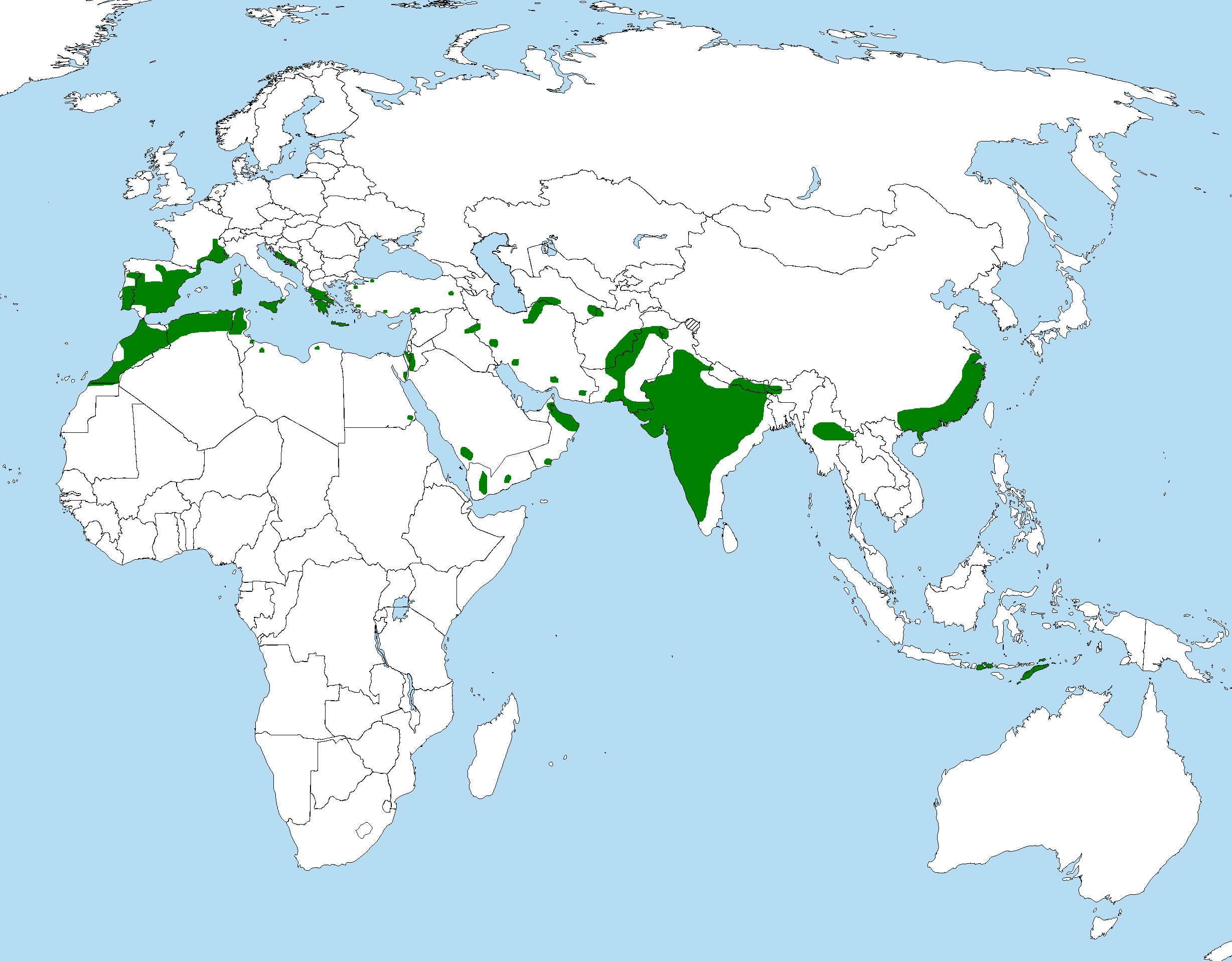
- Distribution of A. fasciata

Synonyms
- Hieraaetus fasciatus; Aquila fasciatus

= Bonelli's eagle =

Large bird of prey

Bonelli's eagle (Aquila fasciata) is a large bird of prey. The common name of the bird commemorates the Italian ornithologist and collector Franco Andrea Bonelli. Bonelli is credited with gathering the type specimen, most likely from an exploration of Sardinia. Like all eagles, Bonelli's eagle belongs to the family Accipitridae. Its feathered legs marked it as member of the Aquilinae or booted eagle subfamily. This species breeds from southern Europe, Africa on the montane perimeter of the Sahara Desert, and across the Indian subcontinent to Indonesia. In Eurasia, this species may be found as far west as Portugal and as far east as southeastern China and Thailand. It is usually a resident breeder.

Bonelli's eagle often occurs in hilly or mountainous habitats, with rocky walls or crags, from sea level to 1,500 m (4,900 ft). Habitats are often open to wooded land and can occur in arid to semi-moist climate. It can be considered partially opportunistic, but is a specialist predator of the European rabbit, galliforms and pigeons. On evidence, when staple prey populations decline or are locally scarce, Bonelli's eagle switches to being an opportunistic predator of a wide variety of birds. Despite its persistence over a large range and its continued classification as a least concern species by the IUCN Red List, Bonelli's eagle has declined precipitously in various parts of its range, including almost all of its European distribution, and may face potential local extinction. Its decline is due to widespread habitat destruction, electrocution from electricity pylons as well as persistent persecution.

== Etymology ==
The generic name Aquila is Latin for "eagle", possibly derived from aquilus, "dark in colour", while the specific name fasciata comes from the Late Latin word "fascia", meaning "band" or "stripe". The common name Bonelli's eagle is for the collector of the type specimen, Franco Andrea Bonelli. Some antiquated texts also refer to it as the crestless hawk-eagle.

== Taxonomy ==
Bonelli's eagle was described in 1822 by Louis Pierre Vieillot. It is a member of the Aquilinae or booted eagles, a monophyletic subfamily of the accipitrid family. At least 38 species are currently part of this subfamily, all with signature well-feathered tarsi. The African hawk-eagle (Aquila spilogaster) was once lumped with Bonelli's eagle, with most accounts until about the 1990s listing the species as monotypical. However, several morphological differences between the two species, life history discrepancies and their considerably allopatric distribution lead them to being considered separate species. Despite the differences between Bonelli's eagle and the African hawk-eagle, the two species are visibly similar and are still considered to form a species complex. However, genetic studies have indicated that they are not closely related relative to other species pairs of the booted eagle subfamily.

DNA research resulted in the two species being moved from the genus Hieraaetus to Aquila, along with another dissimilar species, the Cassin's hawk-eagle (Aquila africana). Bonelli's, African hawk- and Cassin's hawk-eagles were found to be genetically closely related to the golden eagle (Aquila chrysaetos) species complex, which also includes Verreaux's eagle (Aquila verreauxii), Gurney's eagle (Aquila gurneyi) and wedge-tailed eagle (Aquila audax). These species are all conspicuously larger than Bonelli's and African hawk-eagles with differing proportions to their wings, tail and legs (in adaptation to their open country habits) and much darker coloured plumages. Furthermore, the four other traditional members of the genus Aquila have been revealed to be a separate species complex despite showing superficial similarity to the golden eagle group, i.e. being relatively large and long winged with usually dark colouring.

Beyond the nominate subspecies of Bonelli's eagle, which is found throughout its range in Eurasia, a second subspecies dwells in the Lesser Sunda Islands, A. f. renschi. The latter race is linearly smaller, and compared to other Bonelli's eagles tends to have more strikingly barred remiges and tail, the belly, thighs and crissum more boldly marked. At one time, its restricted and very isolated range have caused authors to suggest A. f. renschi may be a full species but recent studies have indicated that it is not genetically distinct enough to be considered a separate species. Furthermore, the most recent analysis couldn't rule out early introductions (possibly by ancient falconers) at least playing a part in the species presence in the Lesser Sundas, as some other established wild birds on those islands are certain to have reached there by early human introductions.

== Description ==
=== Size and form ===
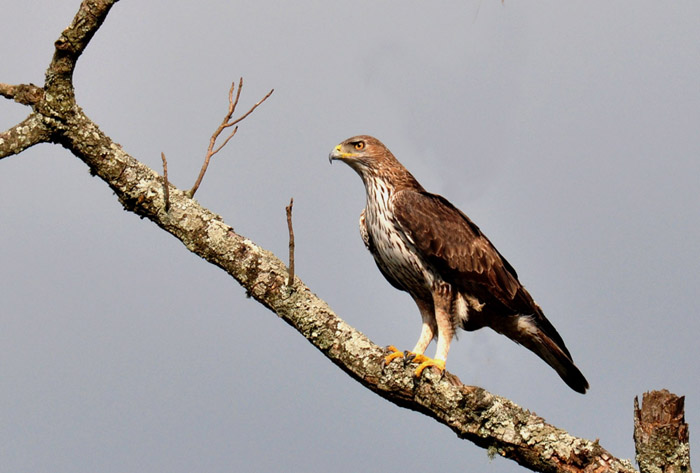
Perched on a tree near a wetland in Biligiriranga Hills

Bonelli's eagle is a fairly large bird of prey and a medium-sized eagle. When still classified as a member of the genus Hieraaetus, it was considered the largest extant species therein, however, as a member of Aquila it is amongst the smallest-bodied species. Amongst the currently accepted species of Aquila eagles, it is of similar size to the tawny eagle (Aquila rapax) (albeit with rather shorter wings than the tawny), slightly larger than the African hawk-eagle and notably larger than the Cassin's hawk-eagle. Like most birds of prey, Bonelli's eagle displays reverse sexual dimorphism as the female is larger than the male to the contrary of most other kinds of birds, in this case she may average about 10% larger overall.

Total length in fully-grown eagles of the species can vary from 55 to 74 cm (22 to 29 in). Wingspan in males can vary from 143 to 163 cm (4 ft 8 in to 5 ft 4 in) while that of the female may vary from 156 to 180 cm (5 ft 1 in to 5 ft 11 in). Prior claims put the weight of this species as 1.4 to 2.4 kg (3.1 to 5.3 lb), however this probably slightly underrepresents both their size and the sexual dimorphism of this eagle. A large sample of full grown males from western Europe were found to average 1.94 kg (4.3 lb), with a range of 1.4 to 2.24 kg (3.1 to 4.9 lb) (sample size of 91), while 87 females were found to average 2.62 kg (5.8 lb), with a range of 2.1 to 3.03 kg (4.6 to 6.7 lb). Mature males from western Europe were found to have averaged 65 cm (26 in) in total length and 155 cm (5 ft 1 in) in wingspan while mature females averaged 70.7 cm (27.8 in) in total length and 167.8 cm (5 ft 6.1 in) in wingspan. Although the linear measurements reportedly increase slightly in average size in the eastern Asian part of the range, body weight was similar or slightly lower at a mean of 1.5 kg (3.3 lb) and 2.5 kg (5.5 lb) for males and females from the Indian subcontinent, respectively, though the sample size is unknown in this case.

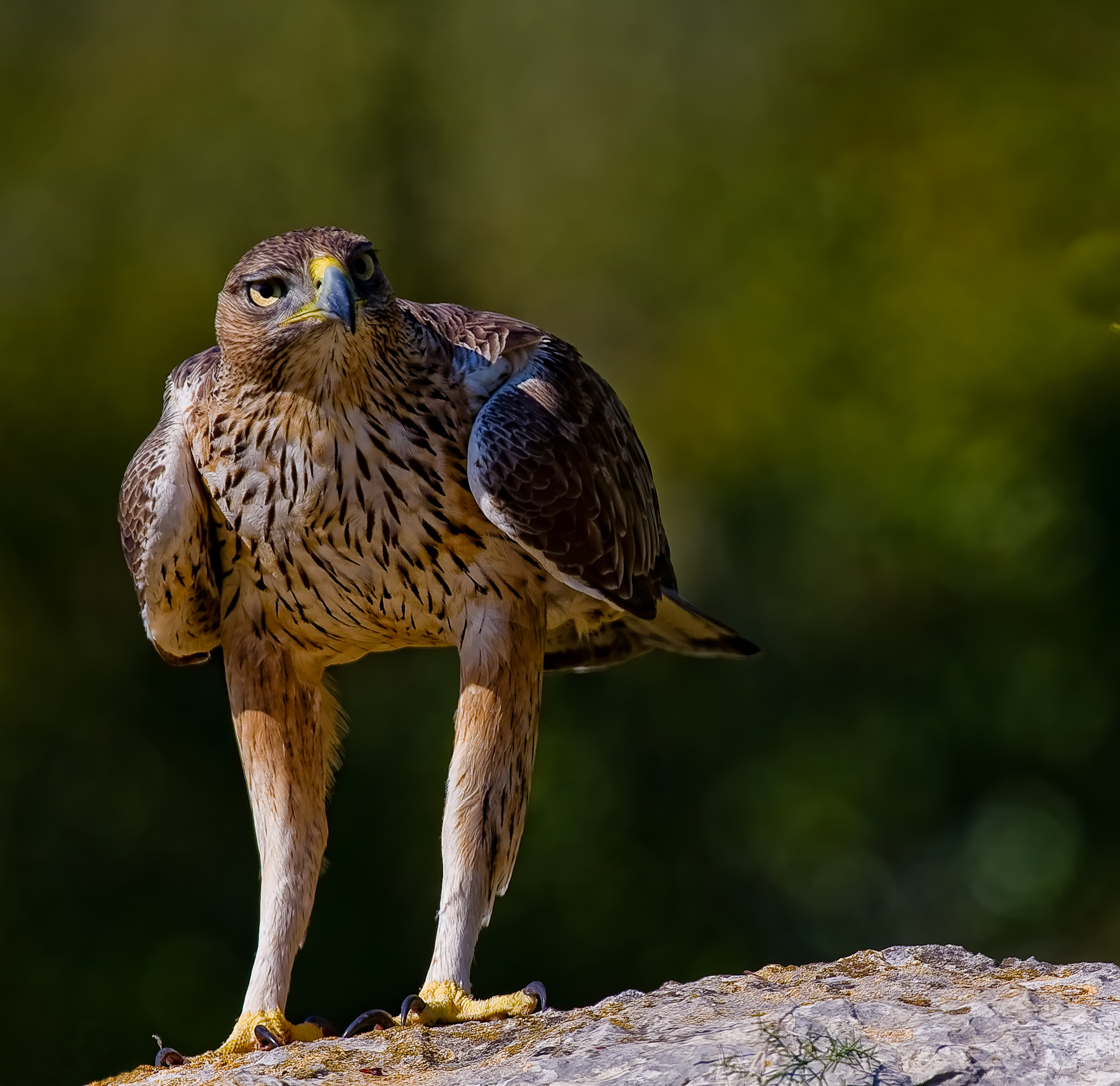
Bonelli's eagles are medium-sized eagles and have distinctly elongated legs and massive feet and talons.

Bonelli's eagles in general form appear to have a medium-sized head on a fairly long neck, a strong bill, a mid-to-longish tail and exceptionally long and well feathered legs. The combination of its well-proportioned, stout body and elongated legs may lend to descriptions of the species as "athletic" in appearance. This eagle often perches with a very upright carriage, at times openly on a rock, a crag, tree branches or some form of post but also in the foliage of tree cover, especially when actively hunting. When perched, the wing tips tend to fall a bit short of the tail tip. Among standard linear measurements, the wing chord of males varies from 458 to 542 mm (18.0 to 21.3 in), with an average in western Europe of 480.4 mm (18.91 in), in tail length from 237 to 287 mm (9.3 to 11.3 in), with an average of 268.1 mm (10.56 in), in tarsus length from 93 to 120 mm (3.7 to 4.7 in), with an average of 99.5 mm (3.92 in) and in total bill length from 40.4 to 45.3 mm (1.59 to 1.78 in), with an average of 43.3 mm (1.70 in). Meanwhile, females vary in wing chord from 478 to 560 mm (18.8 to 22.0 in), in tail length from 246 to 319 mm (9.7 to 12.6 in), with an average of 288.5 mm (11.36 in), in tarsus length from 93 to 127 mm (3.7 to 5.0 in), with an average of 119.1 mm (4.69 in), and in total bill length from 41.3 to 51.8 mm (1.63 to 2.04 in), with an average of 46.6 mm (1.83 in). Two males from the A. f. renschi race measured 444 and 452 mm (17.5 and 17.8 in) in wing chord length and a single female measured 493 mm (19.4 in).

Bonelli's eagle is intermediate in its wing lengths and tail length proportionately between the shorter-tailed and longer-winged eagles of open country and longer-tailed and shorter-winged forest eagles, which allows to vary its hunting between short-burst, agile surprise attacks in trees and ample ground-covering pursuits in the open. Its talons and feet are proportionately very large and presumably rather powerful for the eagle's size. In particular the elongated talon on its rear toe (used as a killing apparatus by almost all accipitrids), or hallux claw, is longer than that of the much larger eastern imperial eagle (Aquila heliaca) and proportionately slightly larger even than its bigger sympatric competitor, the golden eagle. Hallux claw lengths in Bonelli's eagles from western Europe averaged 37.21 mm (1.465 in) in males and in females averaged 43.1 mm (1.70 in), and could farther range up to 47 mm (1.9 in).

=== Colouring and identification ===
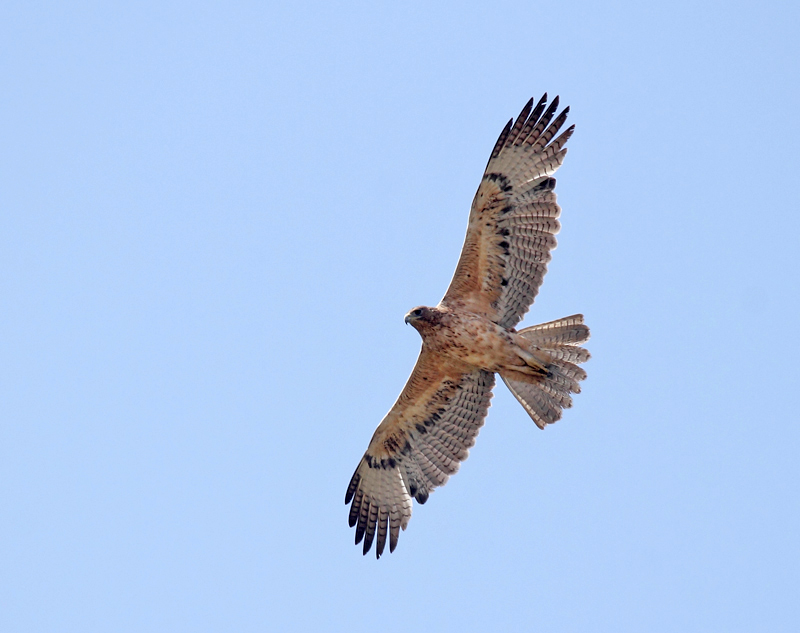
Juvenile Bonelli's eagle in flight, in rural Sangli district.

Adult are dark brown above, from a cold hue similar to dark chocolate to an umber hue depending on their state of molt as well as to some extent individual and regional variances, with pale margins to most feathers. These pale margins are especially broad on the median wing coverts (which thus appear lighter brown overall). Adults also have a variably sized, irregular white patch on the mantle that can vary from nearly absent (though almost never completely so) to being quite large and extending to the upper back. The adult's tail is grey with obscure darker brown thin bars, with a broad blackish subterminal band and creamy white tip. The adult Bonelli's head is dark brown with a paler, often streaky neck and a white throat. The underside has a cream base colour with variable amounts of sparse blackish-brown streaks or drop shaped markings. The adult female averages darker and more heavily patterned than the adult male, particular on the underside, a case of colour sexual dimorphism otherwise seemingly rare in booted eagles.

The streaking on this eagle is normally strongest on the breast and upper flanks while the lower belly and crissum are typically either plain or only faintly marked. Juveniles are a lighter medium brown above with variable paler edges, sometimes with a creamy patch on the back (not the mantle as in the adults) and uppertail coverts. Generally, juveniles have a rusty-brown head with a darker brown around and behind their eyes. The juvenile eagle's crown is either darkly streaked or, occasionally, plain greyish. The tail of young birds is more clearly barred than the adults while the subterminal band is only negligibly thicker than the other bars. Like adults, the juvenile Bonelli's eagle's tail has a thin white tip. The juvenile is light rufous to warm buff below with minimal black streaks, which are normally confined to chest-sides. By their 2nd summer, the young eagles are still largely the same in colouring but tend to become more patchy below with increased heavy streaking. During the gradual further development through subsequent molts, the immature eagles develop a thicker subterminal band and a paler ground colour below. Among the bare parts, adult's eyes are yellow to yellow-orange while those of the juvenile are hazel-brown. Adult plumage is obtained between the 4th and 5th years. At all ages, the cere and feet are both pale yellow.

In flight, Bonelli's eagle is a largish raptor with a well projecting head and broad, long and somewhat square ended wings which are slightly pinched in at body with a little tapering at tips. Feather molts can make the wings look quite variable in shape with some individuals appearing rather longer and narrower winged than others. In flight, the tail appears long and broad but if pinched in can appear surprisingly narrow. This species tends to fly with powerful but loose shallow beats. When gliding, they do so often on flat wings with well-spread feathers and the carpals pressed slightly forward but more so when entering a fast glide. This species soars infrequently on flat or slightly raised wings. At nearly all times of the year, Bonelli's eagles quite often flies in pairs. In colouring, the flying adult is dark above with a variable amount of the white marking on the mantle. The tail has faded barring (rarely perceptible) on grey with a big blotchy subterminal band and a white tip above. The markings on the tail look more or less the same when seen both from below and above. Adult Bonelli's eagles have white lesser coverts which along with the greyish tail stand out in contrast against blackish central wing band over the greater and median coverts. Also the flight feathers are faintly and thinly barred light grey-brown with paler bases, which often become paler (to a whitish hue) on the primaries inside blackish tips and leading wing coverts. In flight, juveniles are brown above with slightly darker wing ends and tips to greater coverts and greyer primary windows. Occasionally, juveniles manifest a creamy patch on back and obscure narrow U above barred tail, which even if present are only sometimes visible. Below the juvenile's wing linings are light rufous to warm buff like the body colour. Usually juveniles appear with darker tips to greater coverts forming wing-diagonals (sometimes lacking or confined to carpal area) and a small but distinct area of white on primaries against the blackish tips. Until the 3rd year, the young eagles appear more like a 1st year juvenile than an adult, but begin developing more streaks below and darker greater underwing coverts. By the 4th year, the subadult Bonelli's are increasingly similar to the adult, with an increasing subterminal band, a whiter underbody and fairly prominent underwing-diagonals. However, subadults are often still appear with a mix of paler barred juvenile type feathers and plainer darker adult feathers on the flight feathers.

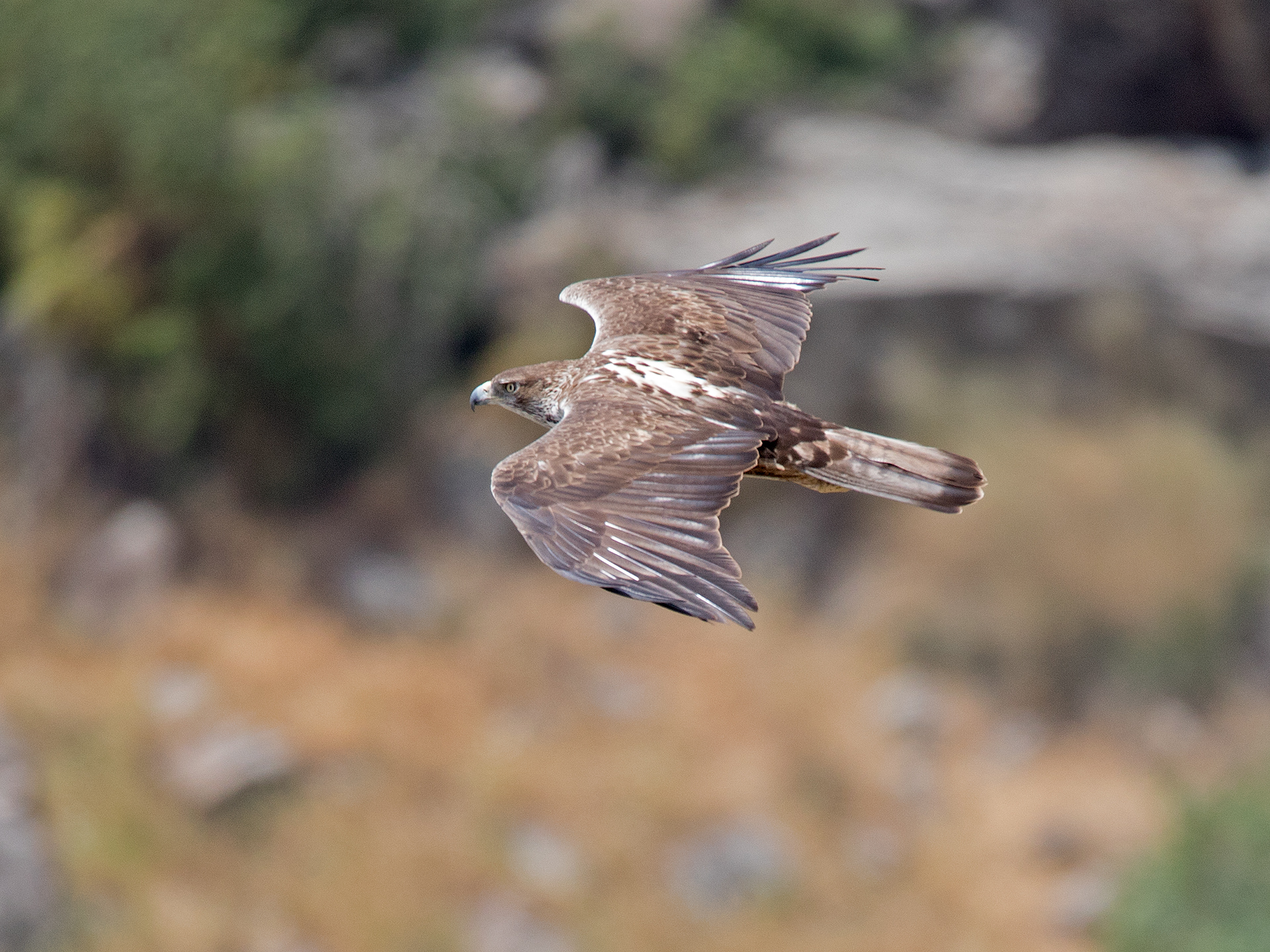
An adult Bonelli's eagle in flight shows its ample white mantle.

Bonelli's eagles are generally unmistakable when shape, flight and plumage are considered in combination. In poor light, it is possible to mistake one with a honey buzzard, one mainly in Europe and another mainly in Asia, as these raptors are extremely polymorphic and can come surprisingly close to approximating the plumage of various more powerful raptors. The wing shape in Bonelli's eagles can at times appear similar to that of honey buzzard but the latter raptor type are usually distinctly slimmer and slighter bodied with a much smaller, slimmer head. In flight, honey buzzards often have notched rather than square ended tails, less emarginated primaries and typically they fly with their wings held more at an angle. The sympatric species of honey buzzard tend to have bolder barring on the tail and underwings, broader dark trailing wing edges and all have no pale mantle patch or darker underwing-diagonals. An unlikely source of confusion is the Eurasian goshawk (Accipiter gentilis), which is usually visibly smaller with much shorter wings, a slightly longer tail, different level flight style and many distinctive plumage characteristics. Distant juvenile Bonelli's could conceivably be mistaken for the long-legged buzzard (Buteo rufinus), but the buzzard is also smaller and is shorter tailed with prominent dark carpal patches and dark trailing wing edges. Furthermore, the buzzard usually holds its wings in a noticeable dihedral when flying in a soar.

Another unlikely confusion species is the short-toed eagle (Circaetus gallicus) which roughly matches the size of Bonelli's eagles but the short-toed has larger and differently rather wedge-shaped wings with a much less dark overall pattern as well as a shorter tail, a rounder head on a shorter neck and usually a dark rather than light throat. Also, goshawks, short-toed eagles and European honey buzzards usually frequent different habitats, more often living in more wooded and lowland habitats. Bonelli's eagles may be mistaken for pale morph adult booted eagle (Hieraeetus pennatus) by inexperienced observers but, beyond being a third larger and more than twice as heavy, Bonelli's eagles are moreover distinct in plumage. Overall Bonelli's are much darker and streaker especially compared to the clearly paler flight feathers of booted eagles. Booted eagles are both whiter and more contrasting on the upperwing coverts, have whitish uppertail-coverts and have white on the wing's patagium. More similar in plumage is the juvenile Bonelli's eagle are the rare rufous morph of the booted eagle but the latter can still be told by the booted species' narrower wings and smaller size. In southern part of the Red Sea, vagrants (largely juveniles) may possibly come into range of the closely related and more similar African hawk-eagle, but the latter is somewhat smaller and comparatively short winged and longer tailed (the total length is similar between the species due to the African's longer tail but Bonelli's can be visibly larger bodied and rather heavier). In the African species, the adult plumage is a more contrasting, with dark slate grey upperparts, purer white underparts with dark streaking. In African hawk-eagles, juveniles compared to Bonelli's are darker above with pale wing-windows.

=== Vocalizations ===
Call of Bonelli's eagle.

Bonelli's eagle is largely silent outside of breeding season and is a somewhat infrequent vocalizer even in the context of breeding. Its calls are less well studied than those of the African hawk-eagle, which although a tropical species, also generally ceases to call outside of the breeding season. The main call of Bonelli's eagle is done during the courtship display and, sometimes, also at the nest. Its main call consists of a loud, shrill, somewhat far-carrying scream, yuiii-yuiii-gii-gii or a drawn-out heeeeii-heeeeii with slight regional or even individual variations. Its call is farther carrying than the "puppy-like" one of the golden eagle and is reminiscent in pitch of that of the red-tailed hawk (Buteo jamaicensis). The call may be given by both sexes. However, the female Bonelli's eagle calls most intensely when the male is delivering prey unlike the preference for vocalizing in aerial display as the male usually does. Other recorded vocalizations have included a fluted, low-pitched klu-klu-klu as well as a repeated ki ki ki in alarm. Also other barking, gurgling and grunting sounds have been reported by researchers at or near the nests.

== Distribution and habitat ==
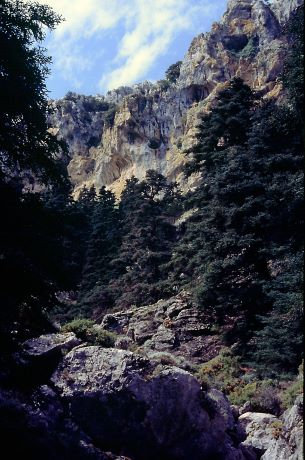
Sierra de las Nieves, Andalucia

Bonelli's eagle has a spotty and sparse worldwide distribution currently. It is distributed in northwestern Africa from the Anti-Atlas in Morocco northeasterly through the lower parts of the Atlas Mountains in northern Algeria and northern Tunisia and probably formerly northern Libya. Beyond its African breeding range, the IUCN Red List and others have mapped out a semi-regular wintering range for Bonelli's eagles, in coastal west Africa from southern Morocco down through Western Sahara, Mauritania and northwestern Senegal, rarely also east to Mali, although little more is reportedly known about this population and its origins and altogether the species is considered largely non-migratory. Additionally, it has been recorded as a vagrant in east Africa in Somalia.

In southern Europe, they range patchily through different parts of Portugal and Spain into southern France as far north as the department of Drôme. Discontinuously, they are now seemingly solely left as breeding bird in Italy on the islands of Sardinia and Sicily. They at least were known to live in Aspromonte National Park in Calabria, near the far southwestern tip of the Italian Peninsula, directly across the narrow Strait of Messina from Sicily. In southeastern Europe, an isolated population possibly persists in Croatia as well as in northern and southern Macedonia (with the further possibility of spilling over into Kosovo) and spottily through different areas of Greece (possibly spilling over the borders in the west in Albania and in the east in Bulgaria), as well as Crete.

Out of Europe, they may be found in western and southern Turkey, Syria (possibly but most likely extirpated), the isle of Cyprus, Lebanon, Israel, western Jordan, northeastern Egypt (rarely in northern half of Sinai Peninsula), possibly but not certainly in spots in the west and south of Saudi Arabia, and elsewhere in the Arabian Peninsula to Yemen, Oman, and the United Arab Emirates. Elsewhere in the Middle East, their range includes eastern Iraq and west, south, and northeastern Iran, extending somewhat into Turkmenistan in the Kopet Dag range.

Further east into Asia, their distribution includes eastern Afghanistan and Pakistan through most of the Indian subcontinent, where generally it is uncommon but more locally common near Nepal. On the other hand, they are absent in eastern India and only occur as a vagrant to Sri Lanka and Bangladesh. In India, they are most regularly found in areas such as the Chambal ravines, Ranthambore National Park, the Chir zone of the lower Kumaun Himalayas, and in winter in the Keoladeo National Park of Bharatpur, Rajasthan. From central Myanmar, they range across into northwestern Thailand and northern Laos (though possibly only as a visitor rather than breeding in the latter two). In southern China, their resident range includes Yunnan, Guangxi, and Guangdong north to the Yangtze River, as well as rarely into Hong Kong. Their isolated Indonesian population range is in the Lesser Sunda Islands, including at least Sumbawa, Timor, Wetar, Luang, and Flores, however records show they've turned up on as many as 20 islands in the Lesser Sundas.

Historically speaking, research published in People and Nature in 2024 by scientists from the University of Granada and Miguel Hernández University of Elche (UMH) indicates that Bonelli's eagle is a relative newcomer to Europe and the Mediterranean Basin and that they spread there with the help of humans around 50,000 years ago. Genetic analyses indicate that the Mediterranean Bonelli's eagle population likely comprised a few individuals around the last glacial maximum, which later thrived as the temperature in the Mediterranean Basin rose, and the human population grew and became sedentary.

Mechanistically, the three bilateral interactions among Bonelli's eagles, golden eagles, and the human population are jointly what allowed Bonelli's eagles to move from the Middle East into the Mediterranean Basin at this time – and also what prevented them from moving there sooner. Golden eagles are less tolerant of humans than Bonelli's eagles are. Additionally, between the two eagle species, the golden eagle is the dominant species, while Bonelli's eagle is the subordinate one. With these interactions in mind, the authors of the 2024 People and Nature study hypothesize and test with data-driven mathematical models that with the arrival of the first anatomically modern humans in Europe, some of the golden eagle territories closest to human settlements were abandoned, and these 'vacant' territories began to be occupied by Bonelli's eagles from the Middle East. That is, Bonelli's eagles could not have established themselves in the Mediterranean before the arrival of the first Homo sapiens because the competitive pressure exerted by golden eagles and other species would have been too overwhelming, but the arrival of humans displaced the golden eagles and provided an empty niche in the localities' ecosystems that Bonelli's eagles were then able to neatly fill.

Bonelli's eagles are mostly residential throughout their range but juvenile can disperse up to over several hundred kilometres. Sometimes, they are recorded at migration sites and at spots where not known to breed in winter. Wanderings include around 700 km (430 mi) north of their regular range in France near the coast of English Channel, far from their normal haunts in Regensburg, Germany and, probably both from the Italian island populations, to northwestern Italy and Slovenia. From their Iberian Peninsula range presumably, vagrants have been reported in the Canary Islands. Beyond Sri Lanka, other areas the species has been known to vagrate (or perhaps rarely winter) in Asia have included Kazakhstan, the Korean Peninsula, Malaysia and Cochinchina in Vietnam, as well as a record in winter 1996 on the isle of Yamdena, the latter presumably from the Lesser Sunda population.

=== Habitat ===
Bonelli's eagle usually lives at an elevation of 1,500 m (4,900 ft) or lower in Europe, in the Himalayas at 1,200–2,000 m (3,900–6,600 ft) and up to 3,750 m (12,300 ft) in Bhutan, at 2,000 m (6,600 ft) in the Atlas Mountains. It tends to dwell in similar habitat types across its range and lives in lands hugging large bodies of water, largely the Mediterranean Sea and northern Indian Ocean. To a lesser extent, it lives near the coast of the Atlantic and the Pacific Oceans and near the Caspian Sea. Despite often being near seas and oceans it mostly occurs in fairly arid habitats and in quite sunny areas. It prefers rocky areas including lower mountains, foothills with plentiful cliffs and steep sided canyons; it is very skilled at hunting in craggy, irregular rocky terrain. Usually, extensive garrigue-type habitat such as low bushes or more substantial vegetation such as scattered trees are a common feature of residential ranges but also at times even denser woodlands. Such scrubby areas are key since they hold prey concentration in Mediterranean habitats. However, excessive ground cover may limit hunting success, so it avoids dense scrub. In the Mediterranean region, it visits pine or sclerophyll forests, but avoids deep forests. In Spain and Sicily, it shows a preference for agricultural arable land and other human-modified habitats, probably because it preys on feral pigeons. However, it avoids urban areas. It may additionally range into timbered plains or even virtually barren slopes or semi-desert, especially in Israel and India where moister valleys intersect with deserts. Juveniles may take up temporary residence over dry cultivation, small wetland areas, coastlines or surprisingly deep woodlands.

In winter, Bonelli's eagle occurs at lower elevations and more open habitats in semi-deserts and plains, where it can appear surprisingly at home; it often prefers wetter habitats such as large river mouths, marshlands and lakes, especially where these fall in existing home range, as prey is more likely to be concentrated in such areas. In some of the Indian subcontinent, Southeast Asia and the Lesser Sundas, Bonelli's eagle inhabits tropical rainforest that is much wetter and more humid than their typical habitats, and in such areas it is attracted to more sparse and rocky areas such as slopes and cliffs as well as alternately open mosaics and glades.

== Behaviour and ecology ==
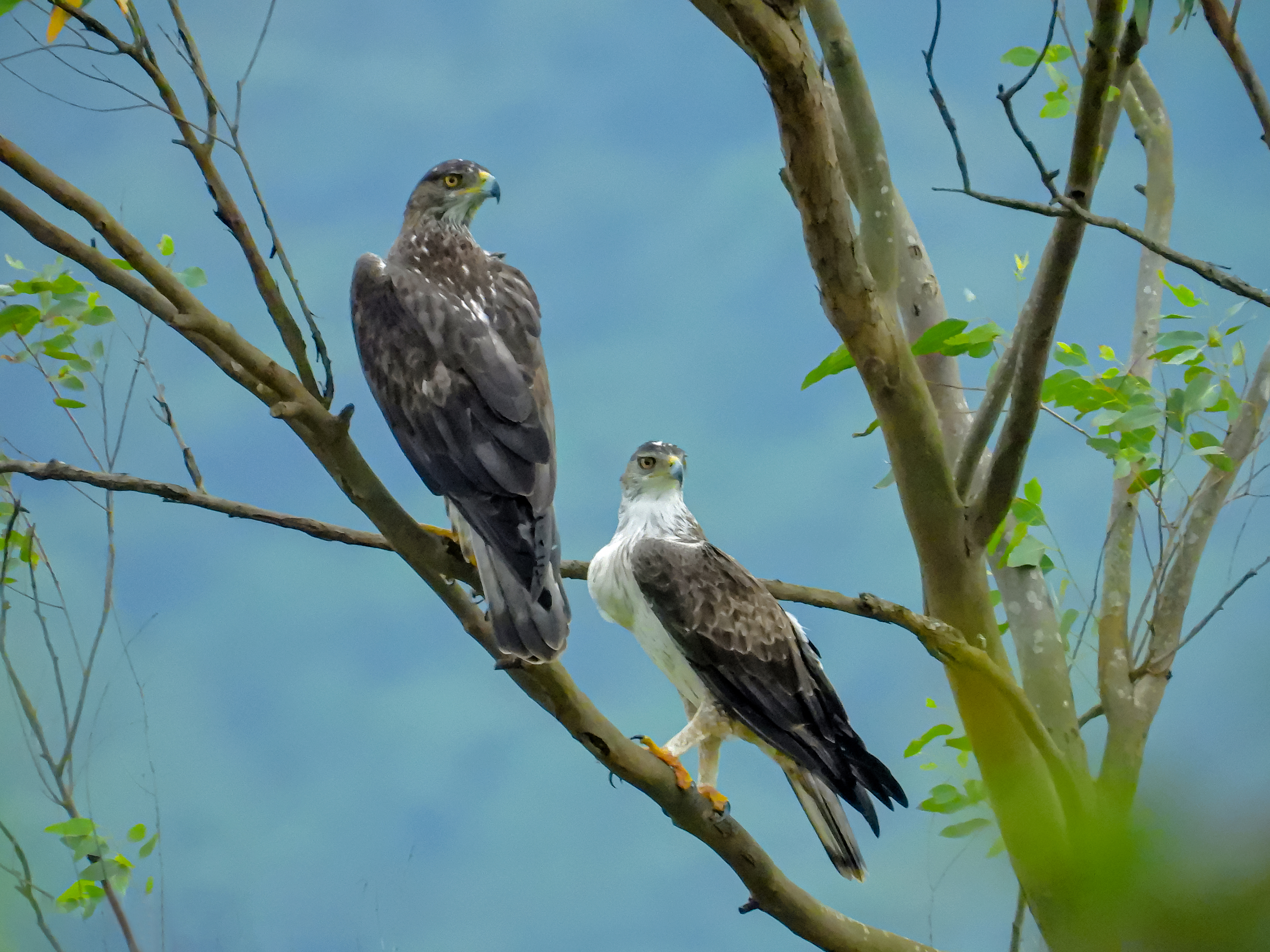
Pair of Bonelli's eagle at Raigad

This species is very aerial, often given to soaring and circling over its home range. Like most raptorial birds, it mainly lives solitarily or in a breeding pair. Bonelli's eagle is a powerful predator, and has been described as rather "bold and rapacious". Its primary hunting methods recall those of a powerful Accipiter such as a goshawk. Most commonly, this eagle still-hunts, often either utilizing a concealed tree perch or a lofty spot in irregular rocky terrain to watch for prey activity. Upon spotting its quarry, it often dashes out rapidly to take birds as they take off or a mammal as it runs for cover, at times making lengthy tail-chase that may continue between trees or into tree stands or bushes. Not infrequently as a latter part of a tail chase, these eagles (again reminiscent of a goshawk) will occasionally walk on the ground to obtain their prey. Bonelli's eagles also hunt in a quartering flying style relatively close to the ground (in a fashion reminiscent of a harrier) or patrols hillsides for prey activity.

Bonelli's eagles will also occasionally stoop from a soaring height onto prey. Mostly, this predator takes birds from on or near the ground but some snatched them from bushes and, seldom, water. It has been known to have sufficient agility to catch some birds from active flight. In one case, a Bonelli's eagle was observed to fly below a jackdaw and swoop upwards to grab it from below. Tandem hunting by a lifelong pair is quite common, almost exceptionally so in this species. One eagle tends to fly directly above the other, with several cases of one eagle scattering a bird flock for the other eagle to quickly single out, in a similar style to tandem-hunting laggar falcons (Falco jugger). However, per Spanish studies, apparently tandem hunting neither improved hunting success nor were the eagles able to capture larger prey (in fact the estimated prey size by pairs was slightly lower than that taken by each mate hunting by itself) while hunting in tandem. It was hypothesized that tandem hunting is more important to the socio-sexual relations of the pair rather than capture of a significant amount of prey. Compared to most other booted eagles, Bonelli's eagle takes a great majority of its prey alive and seldom comes to carrion or pirates foods from other raptors. However, it will readily come to previously injured prey, especially water birds shot by duck hunters, and will readily take young animals across most prey classes. Also, in Keoladeo National Park, India, Bonelli's eagles were observed to habitually follow harriers, spotted eagles and other Aquila eagles in order to capture water birds incidentally flushed during their flybys.

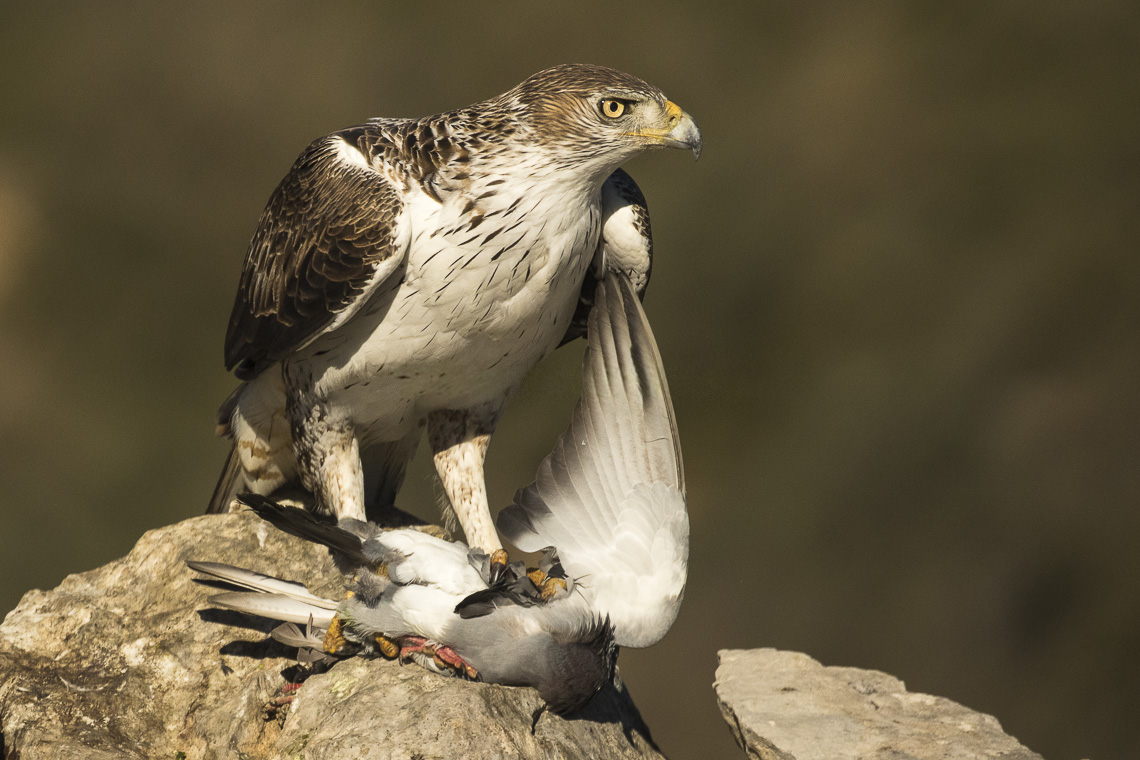
A Bonelli's eagle that has caught a rock dove, one of the favoured prey species.

Overall, Bonelli's eagles take a fairly wide variety of prey. Across its wide range, their prey spectrum has been known to include perhaps up to nearly 200 prey species. Dietary studies have primarily been conducted in western Europe, though some study has gone into their food habits elsewhere (being well known in Cyprus and, less so, India). Brown & Amadon (1986) considered Bonelli's eagles prey size range as nearly as extensive as the most massive booted eagles, such as the golden eagle and the martial eagle (Polemaetus bellicosus) (but mainly may have been describing the African hawk-eagle that was lumped at the time). Bonelli's eagles mainly hunts birds and mammals, taking reptiles and other prey types on a more local and sporadic basis. In western Europe, it is considered something of a specialist predator on rabbits and partridges, though other birds such as pigeons, gulls and corvids sometimes are taken as much or more so depending on local prey population trends.

Pellet analysis is considered the most reliable way to get a complete picture of Bonelli's eagle dietary habits. Despite its predaceous power, typically the average size of prey taken are within average range for a raptorial bird and it may take smaller prey on average than its mildly smaller cousin, the African hawk-eagle. In Sierra Morena, Spain, the mean size of prey taken was estimated at 630 g (22 oz), while in Greece the mean prey size was estimated at 877 g (30.9 oz). A subsequent study in Spain, however, posited the mean prey size as lower than in the past, stating that prey taken by males averaged an estimated 416 g (14.7 oz) and by females at 459 g (16.2 oz), probably due to increased importance of pigeons and reduced numbers of rabbits. Thus, on average, prey sizes average about 20–45% of Bonelli's eagles own weight. Furthermore, the latter Spanish study found hunting success of Bonelli's eagles to average around 28.5%, a slightly higher hunting success rate than golden eagles (20%) or lesser spotted eagles (Clanga pomarina) (24%) but slightly lower than greater spotted eagles (Clanga clanga) (34%).

=== Rabbits and other lagomorphs ===
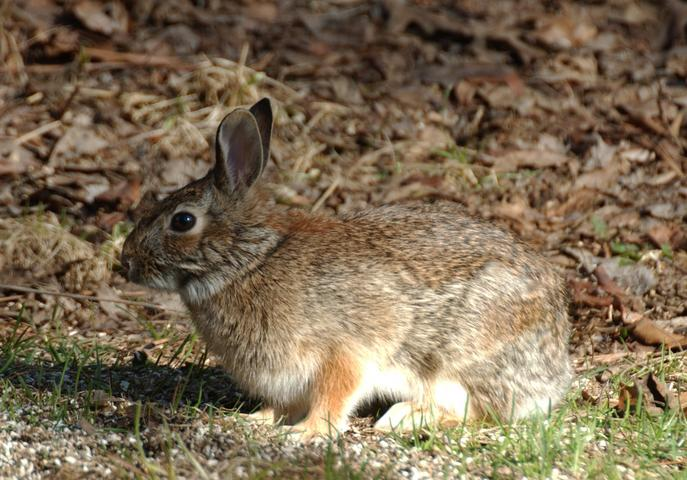
European rabbits are strongly favoured prey for Bonelli's eagles in western Europe.

More than any other, the European rabbit (Oryctolagus cuniculus) is considered the most important prey species for most European Bonelli's eagles. In the largest European studies, the rabbit is usually the leading prey species: such as in Catalonia, Spain where rabbits comprised 22.54% of 2254 prey items (and 33.3% of the prey biomass) and in Provence, France where rabbits made up 16.4% of 2742 prey items. In the third largest western European study, rabbits were secondary in number to pigeons (at 18.4% of 1641 prey items) but were still the largest contributors of biomass, at 33.2%. Even where non-native, such as the Aegean islands of Greece, the European rabbit dominated the foods of this eagle, comprising 40.8% by number and 46.6% by biomass of the foods. In Spain, it was found that about three-quarters of studied floating juvenile Bonelli's eagles were hunting rabbits almost exclusively, apparently as they were easier to capture despite their larger size than bird prey.

Research determines that Bonelli's eagle are often attracted to scrub areas during hunting forays to catch sight of rabbits foraying out of vegetative cover. Since young juvenile and yearling rabbits are forced out to more open feeding spots by dominant adult rabbits, they are disproportionately often selected by Bonelli's eagles and other avian predators. Rabbits become more commonly caught during the summer when the young rabbits tend to disperse. On the contrary, 86.2% of the rabbits taken in southwest Portugal were reportedly adults. Most rabbits caught by Bonelli's eagle were estimated to weigh between 500 and 1,500 g (18 and 53 oz) (from the size of a kit to a smallish adult) per Spanish studies, with an estimated average weight in Spain of 857 g (30.2 oz). A study in southeastern Spain estimated that the region's Bonelli's eagles claim about 337 rabbits during the breeding season and 237 rabbits during non-breeding during the course of a year, so despite their heavy predation barely make a dent on the overall population of rabbits (effecting less than 2.5% of the population at peak). The native western European population of wild rabbit has been heavily depleted by myxomatosis and rabbit haemorrhagic disease, having been reduced by an estimated 50–70%. While the overall numbers seemingly taken by them reduced by as much as a third between 1968 and 2009, on evidence Bonelli's eagle still sought them out and hunted rabbits preferentially even during the non-breeding season when their numbers dip to their lowest. In additional, significant numbers of other lagomorphs may be taken, extending to occasional Granada hares (Lepus granatensis) as well as accounts of Bonelli's eagles hunting European hares (Lepus europaeus) in the Greek isles and Indian hares (Lepus nigricollis) in the lower Himalayas.

=== Gamebirds and pigeons ===
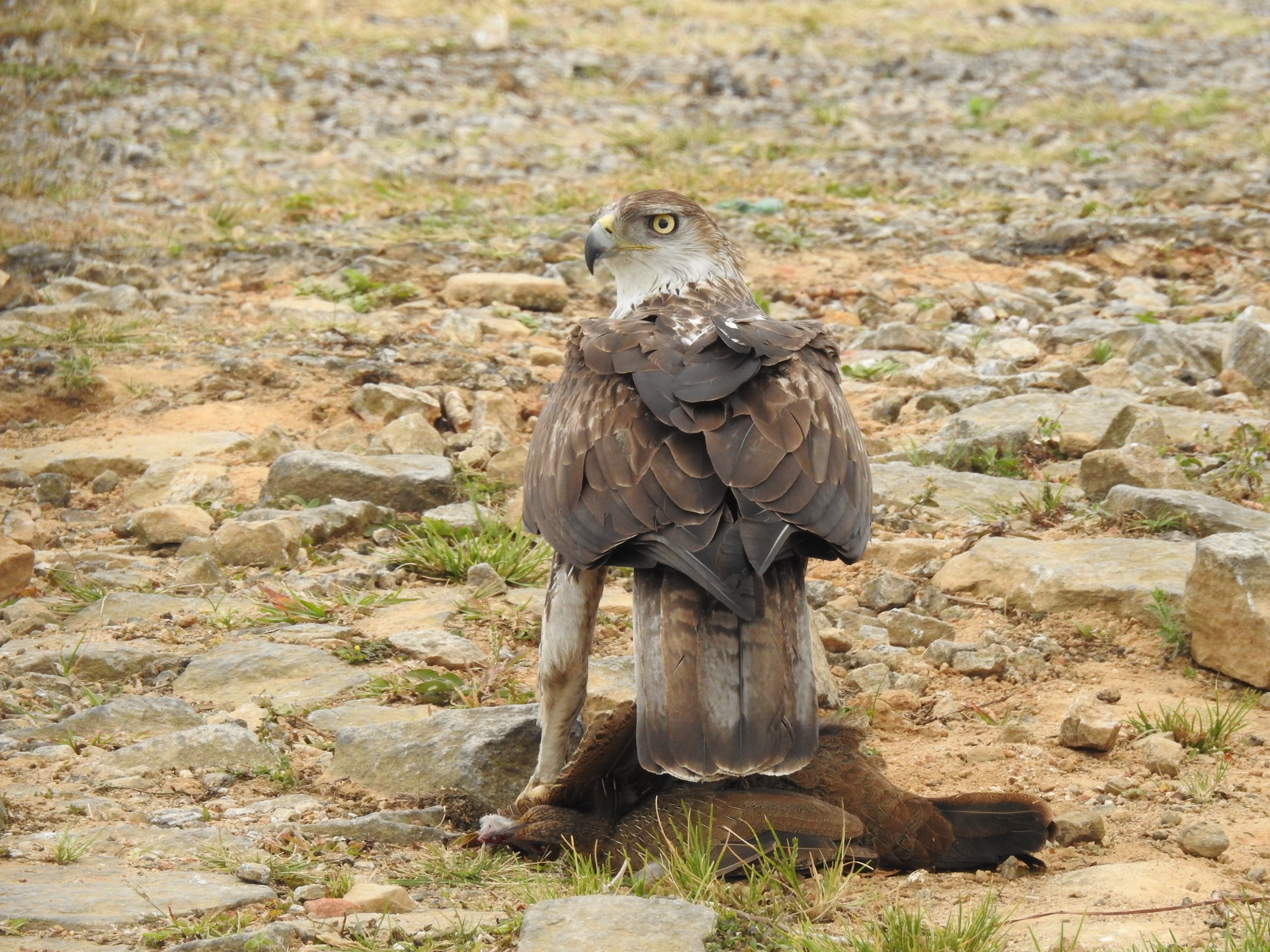
Bonelli's eagle with a freshly caught grey junglefowl. Gamebirds such as junglefowl are favoured in the diet whenever available.

The main secondary wild prey species associated with Bonelli's eagles is the red-legged partridge (Alectoris rufa). Although at times capable of evading the attentions of eagles, this partridge occurs in conveys in the same mixed scrub that hold rabbits and is taken whenever the eagles are lucky enough to have the element of surprise. About 383 red-legged partridges were estimated to be hunted annually in one study area of southwestern Spain. In the large Spanish study of Catalonia, French study of Provence and in southwest Portugal, the red-legged partridge made up 9.57%, 11.6% and 17.2% of the diet by number, respectively. More so than any other prey type outside of western Europe, gamebirds such as partridges seem to be globally the most favoured prey type where available for Bonelli's eagle. In Cyprus, a review of 528 prey items, revealed that the chukar (Alectoris chukar) was the main prey at 31.4% of the diet. More than a dozen gamebirds have been detected in the foods of this species from Asia with at least a half dozen genera turning up in a few reviews of their ecology in India. At times, even adult Indian peafowl (Pavo cristatus), potentially weighing up to 6 kg (13 lb), have been dispatched by this species. In the Lesser Sunda Islands, most eye-witness accounts of their hunting habits indicate that wild (or, on some islands, introduced) green junglefowl (Gallus varius) as well as village chickens (Gallus gallus) are likely to be the most important prey.

Beyond gamebirds, pigeons are the other most significant avian prey type. The two larger European pigeons, the oft feral or domestic rock dove (Columba livia) and the common wood pigeon (Columba palumbus), are almost solely favoured among this group where encountered. In southwest Portugal, pigeons have surpassed rabbits (due to their disease-based decline) to become the most important prey. Here, attempts were made to parse the proportion of feral pigeons that were taken against the number of domestic pigeons (since pigeon fanciers frequently persecute this eagle due its allegedly heavily predation of domestic birds). Of the 1497 prey items overall, feral pigeons were found to comprise 30.1% of the food by number and 26% of the biomass while the domestic types made up only 9.7% of the diet by number and 7.2% of the biomass. In Catalonia, Spain, unidentified pigeons made up 17.8% of the foods and 17.4% of the biomass while identified common wood pigeons made up a further 6.24% of the number and 6.54% of the biomass, while a smaller study from the same area boosted wood pigeons to make up 11.3% of 524 prey items. In Cyprus, rock and common wood pigeons collectively made up 27.7% of the diet.

=== Other birds ===
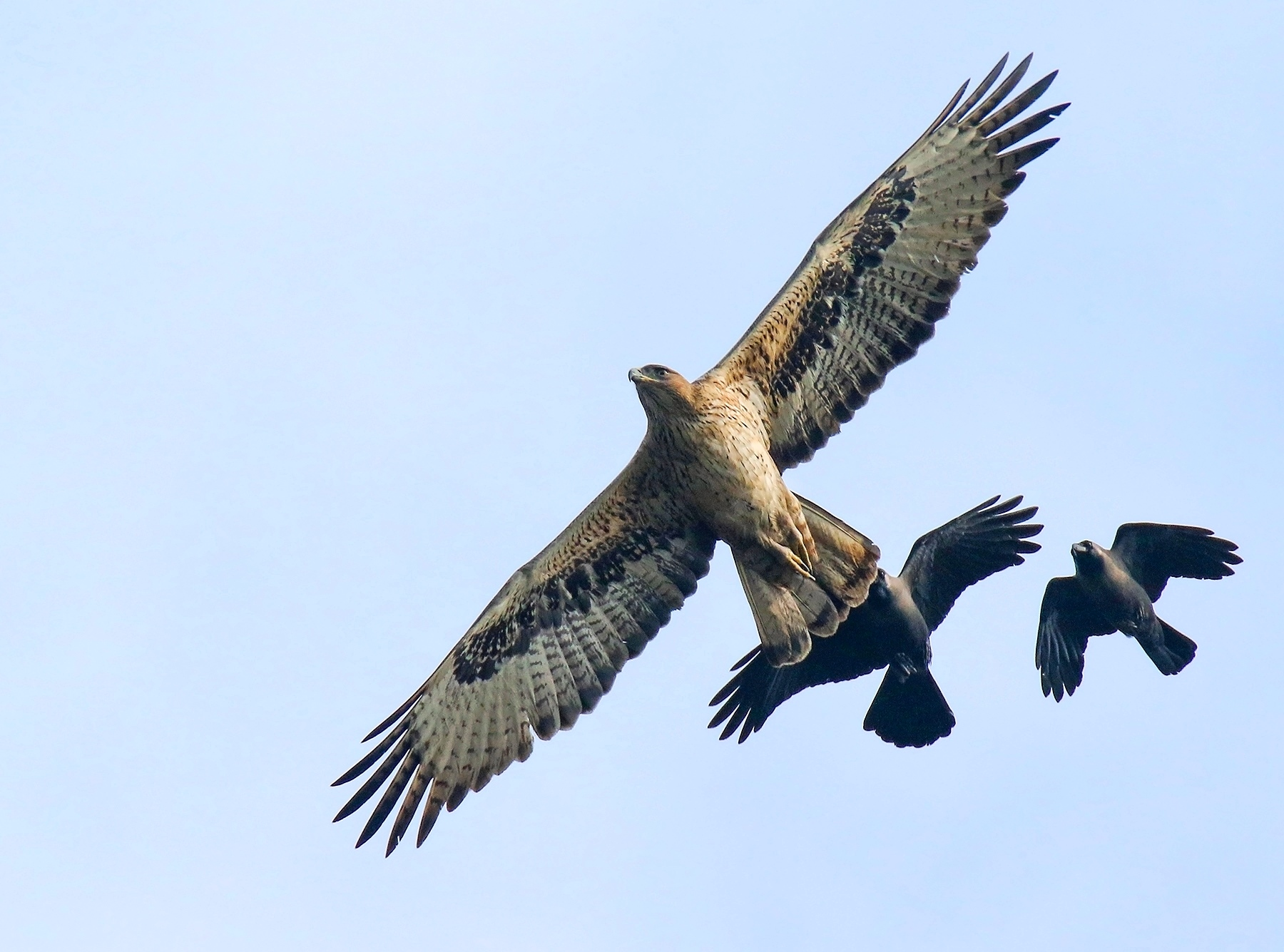
A Bonelli's eagle being mobbed by house crows in Pakistan, as the eagle is a common predator of corvids.

Other medium-sized birds are taken widely by Bonelli's eagles. A popular dietary choice in western Europe was yellow-legged gulls (Larus michahellis), weighing an estimated 1,119 g (39.5 oz). In the 2,724 prey items in Provence, this gull was second only to the rabbit in number, comprising 14.6% of the diet. Other gulls are taken by Bonelli's eagles as well as wide diversity of other water birds, including rails, Eurasian stone-curlew, northern lapwing, sandpipers, tubenoses, cormorants and herons. Water birds taken Bonelli's eagles may vary in size from wading birds as small as 48 g (1.7 oz) common sandpiper (Acitis hypoleucos) and diving birds as small as 174 g (6.1 oz) little grebes (Tachybaptus ruficollis) to those as large as adults of 3.18 kg (7.0 lb) painted storks (Ciconia leucocephala), 3.31 kg (7.3 lb) greylag goose (Anser anser) (though reportedly taken while injured by buckshot in India), and 5.5 kg (12 lb) common crane (Grus grus). Corvids, of a dozen or more species and up to the size of the 1.1 kg (2.4 lb) common raven (Corvus corax), are taken in considerable numbers in differing parts of the range.

In Provence, Eurasian magpie (Pica pica) and western jackdaw (Corvus monedula) made up 10.17% and 9.95% of the diet respectively. In Portugal, Eurasian jay comprised 7.5% by number but only 2.7% of the biomass. Corvids were the main prey for Bonelli's eagles in Georgia, with the Eurasian magpie comprising 12.3% of the diet, though largely young were reportedly taken, and carrion crows (Corvus corone) making up a further 10.76%. In the Aegean islands, carrion crows comprised 14.1% of the prey by number and 8.8% of the biomass, while south of Turkey in Cyprus, western jackdaw comprised 7.6% of the foods. Other avian prey groups taken in usually smaller numbers include cuckoos, swifts, bustards, European nightjar, European bee-eater, European roller, Eurasian hoopoe, woodpeckers, parrots, and various larks, swallows, Iberian grey shrike, accentors, at least 10 Old World flycatcher species, thrushes, pipits, starlings, buntings, finches and house sparrows. In total, about 130 bird species may be taken and birds as a whole almost always form the most ample part of the diet compared to other classes: 69.5% and 80.97% of the biomass in the south of France, 67.7% in Georgia and 62.6% in Catalonia.

=== Other assorted prey ===
Beyond the high significance of rabbits (and sometimes other lagomorphs), other mammals are rarely as important or diverse in the diet of Bonelli's eagles as birds are. A couple of rodents can be locally significant secondary prey, however. The red squirrel (Sciurus vulgaris), with a mean estimated mass in Spain of 241 g (8.5 oz), was reported in almost all western Europe studies, with about 130 reported as taken in studies from Provence, France. The black rat (Rattus rattus), of similar size to the squirrel at an average of about 200 g (7.1 oz) was an important secondary food source in islands south and east of Greece, being the second most common prey species in Cyprus (15.5% of 528 prey items) and fifth most important prey species in the Aegean islands. In northwestern Africa such as Morocco, it was reported that the fat sand rat (Psammomys obesus), another rodent of similar size, was amongst the favourite foods locally for Bonelli's eagles. Other rodent species known in the diet of Bonelli's eagles have included other squirrels, gundis, assorted mice, voles, dormice and blind mole rats. Beyond a few species of hedgehogs, additional mammalian prey for this species, although seldom taken, can be relatively large. They have been known to attack the young of various ungulates include blackbuck (Antilope cervicapra), chinkara (Gazella bennettii), domestic goats (Capra aegagrus hircus) and domestic sheep (Ovis aries). In the Aegean islands, live-caught but often young and small goat kids comprised 8.5% of the foods and 24.3% of the biomass at nests.

Among carnivorans, Bonelli's eagles have reportedly attacked red fox (Vulpes vulpes) and wildcats (Felis silvestris) (probably mostly kits and kittens of these two species) in western Europe as well as stone martens (Martes foina) and assorted weasels. Meanwhile, adult Bengal fox (Vulpes bengalensis) have reportedly been caught in India. In France and Spain, mammals overall comprised 34.8% and 26.1% of the diet, respectively, whereas in Georgia they made up 15.4% of the diet. Reptiles are usually secondary prey throughout the range. Though they are known to hunt snakes, Bonelli's eagles rarely hunt them and generally seem to pursue lizards by preference. In Cyprus, starred agamas (Laudakia stellio) comprised 5.9% of the food, unidentified Lacerta lizards 10.76% of diet in Georgia (and reptiles altogether adding up to 16.9% of the food by number). Relatively large adult specimens of ocellated lizard (Timon lepidus), at 228 g (8.0 oz) in mean body mass, made up 3.97% of the biomass and 7.05% by number in Catalonia, Spain. Desert monitor (Varanus griseus) and probably assorted other monitor lizards were reportedly amongst the leading prey for Bonelli's eagles in several parts of India. Minor prey includes toads and possibly a few other types of amphibian. Potentially insects and/or other invertebrates may be taken but these may incidentally consumed (i.e. undigested food from the stomachs of prey).

=== Interspecies predatory relationships ===
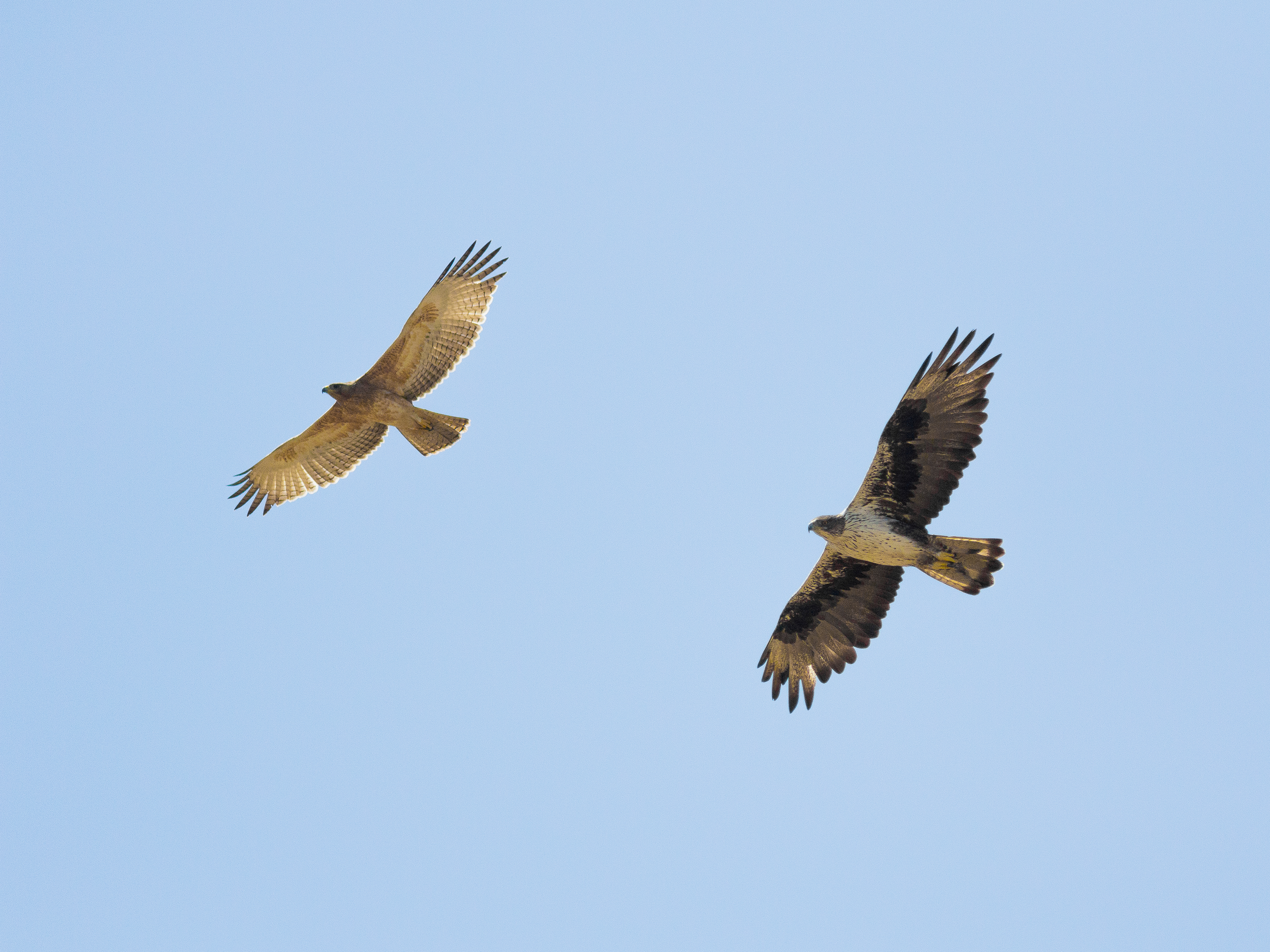
While other birds of prey present some competition for Bonelli's eagles, intraspecific conflicts are the most significant. Here an adult escorts out a wandering juvenile from its range.

Bonelli's eagles frequently occur in range with multiple other eagles and competing predators. Almost certainly the most direct competitor from their European range to the Middle East is their much larger cousin, the golden eagle. Habitat preferences overlap between these two eagles with both species favouring rocky habitats, though the golden eagle regularly dwells at slightly higher elevations with alpine meadows (though is as adaptive to low elevations as Bonelli's so long as habitat is favourable and undisturbed). Competition between the eagles has been reported in particular from Spain, in areas such as Sierra Morena. Both species excluded each other from mutual territories and had broadly overlapping food habits. However, Bonelli's eagle took more birds and golden eagle more singularly hunted rabbits. Mean distance between nests on a plot of 2,200 km^{2} (850 sq mi) was found to be 10.2 km (6.3 mi) for 8 pairs of golden eagles and 11.4 km (7.1 mi) for 10 pairs of Bonelli's. The two can co-exist with sufficiently large ranges as long as they are able to maintain their own range, with the existence of trophic segregation (by size and the more avian based diet of Bonelli's) and the lag in the breeding periods, as these natural mechanisms would allow the coexistence of both species in the mountain.

Cases of golden eagles taking over prior Bonelli's eagles territories have been reported but usually golden eagles only takes up the prior Bonelli's territory when the latter vanishes due to unrelated (often anthropogenic) causes not direct competition or usurpation. A minor negative effect has been probably correlated with golden eagles not infrequently attacking and displacing juvenile and subadult Bonelli's eagles and can tend to be behaviourally dominant in keeping with its larger size. This in turn presumably hampers the ability of Bonelli's to expand their range after declines and stabilize their population. Further east, in Israel, Bonelli's and golden eagles are competitors as well. In the dry, barren Negev desert, golden eagles nests were found 13.1 km (8.1 mi) apart and Bonelli's were scarce. In the Judean desert, which has more annual rainfall and more available prey, the distance between golden eagle nests averaged 16 km (9.9 mi) and Bonelli's eagle easily outnumbered them. Apparently, Bonelli's eagle exceptionally outcompeted its larger cousin here due to a subtle topographic variation in the habitat. In Spain, Bonelli's eagles share cliff habitats beyond golden eagles also with peregrine falcons (Falco peregrinus), common ravens, Eurasian eagle-owls (Bubo bubo) and three species of vulture. The eagles tend to dominate the smaller carnivorous birds in most circumstances, even the swifter peregrine. However, the still larger griffon vulture (Gyps fulvus) was apparently a routine territory and nest usurper of other birds of prey, displacing golden eagles, bearded vultures (Gypaetus barbatus) and Egyptian vultures (Neophron percnopterus) from their nests as well as 9 out of 23 eyries built by Bonelli's eagles in the study area. Despite their prior claimed "dominance" over the swift falcons, at least three cases have been observed of peregrine falcons usurping Bonelli's eagle (presumably through routine harassment and dive-bombing) nests in Spain. Beyond golden eagles, peregrines and griffon vultures, tawny owls (Strix aluco) have been known to take over old Bonelli's eagle nests.

European rabbits have a huge range of predators in the Iberian Peninsula, with at least 30 different species known to hunt the once densely populated lagomorph. Besides the overlapping ranges of Bonelli's and golden eagles, most other birds of prey that hunt rabbits extensively are partitioned from the potential depletive effect of competition by differences in habitat preferences, hunting techniques and temporal activity. Beyond the specialized mammalian predator, the Iberian lynx (Lynx pardinus), some of the other most specialized predators of wild rabbits are Bonelli's eagles, golden eagles, Spanish imperial eagles (Aquila adalberti) and Eurasian eagle-owls. A comparative study indicated that the golden eagle diet was comprised 40% by rabbits, while they made up 49% for eagle-owls, 50% for Spanish imperial eagles and 61% for Bonelli's eagle. Elsewhere, higher import has been applied for rabbits in the local diet of golden eagles as well as for Spanish imperial eagles. The mean size of rabbits taken increases more or less with the size of the avian predator: 662 g (23.4 oz) for Eurasian goshawks, 857 g (30.2 oz) for Bonelli's eagles, 1,000 g (35 oz) for Eurasian eagle-owls and 1,360 g (48 oz) for golden eagles.

Along with northern goshawks, golden eagles and Eurasian eagle-owls, Bonelli's eagle is considered a "super predator" in the European region due to its habit of hunting other predators. In contrast to the other birds of prey, they are somewhat less commonly at high predator status compared to goshawks (most common predator of other diurnal raptors in studies), golden eagles (most common predator of mesopredator mammals), and eagle-owl (most common predator of other owls). However, they are relatively common predators of other diurnal birds of prey, per overall analysis they took such prey somewhat more regularly than did golden eagles in Europe. Among the other accipitrids that Bonelli's eagle have been known to hunt include the Indian spotted eagle (Clanga hastata), European honey buzzard (Pernis apivorus), red kite (Milvus milvus), black kite (Milvus migrans), western marsh harrier (Circus aeruginosus), Montagu's harrier (Circus pygargus), hen harrier (Circus cyaenus), Eurasian sparrowhawk (Accipiter nisus), shikra (Accipiter badius), Eurasian goshawk, long-legged buzzard and common buzzard (Buteo buteo). Among falcons, they have been known to prey upon common kestrel (Falco tinnunculus), lesser kestrel (Falco naumanni) and peregrine falcon and as for owls, tawny owl (Strix alucco), little owl (Athene noctua), long-eared owl (Asio otus), short-eared owl (Asio flammeus) and most impressively of all, in at least one instance, an adult Eurasian eagle-owl. Although usually classed as an apex predator, as in most cases of apex predators in competitive environments, Bonelli's eagles sometimes infrequently fall victim to interspecific killings and predation as well. Eurasian eagle-owls have been known to prey on Bonelli's nestlings a few times and possibly also an adult at least once. In one case, a subadult male golden eagle preyed upon an adult male Bonelli's eagle. Stone martens are also counted amongst the predators of nests taking eggs in southeastern Spain.

== Breeding ==
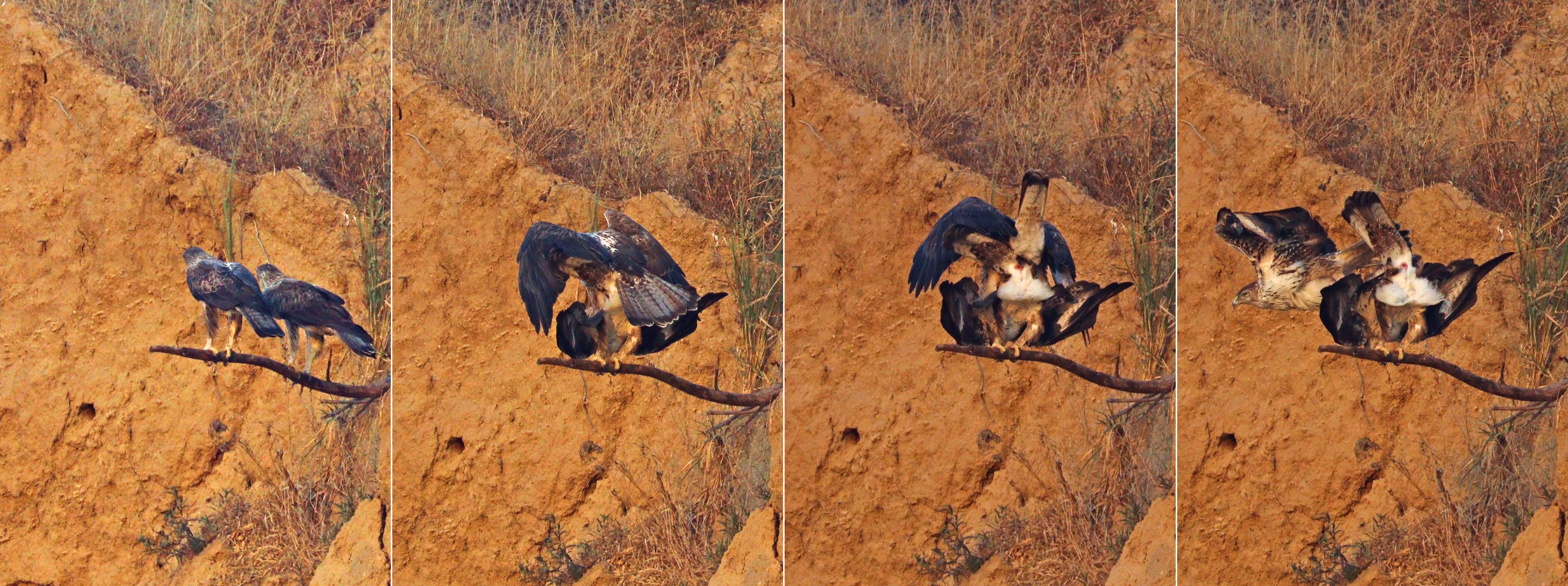
mating on the Southern bank of the Chambal River, Uttar Pradesh, India.

=== Pair formation and nest distribution ===
Bonelli's eagles, like most but not all raptorial birds, generally lives solitarily or in pairs. They usually mate for life. Territories are maintained through aerial displays which often involve calling, single or mutual high circling and, most frequently, sky-dancing in the area of eyrie. During this species' sky-dances, one or other of the eagle pair plunges headlong from a great height, with its wings almost closed, before checking and rising again on stiff wings, circling to regain original altitude and diving again. The sky-dance sequence may be repeated up to 5–10 times. Occasionally but usually infrequently, territorial exclusions escalate into talon grappling between a territorial bird and an intruder. Aerial display extend with diminished frequency into the incubation and early nestling periods. In Spain, the average estimated size of a pairs home range was a very large 44.2 km^{2} (17.1 sq mi), though only 27.3% of their home ranges on average were used in all seasons. Home ranges in Portugal were estimated to average up to 130 km^{2} (50 sq mi). On Cyprus, the mean nearest neighbor distance was 7.4 km (4.6 mi) with 0.52–0.65 pairs per 100 km^{2} (39 sq mi). Contrary to many other raptor species, it was found that were no significant relationship between the density of their main prey species and the distance of the neighbouring pairs. A dead or missing mate may be quickly replaced and mature adults have additionally been seen breeding with subadults.

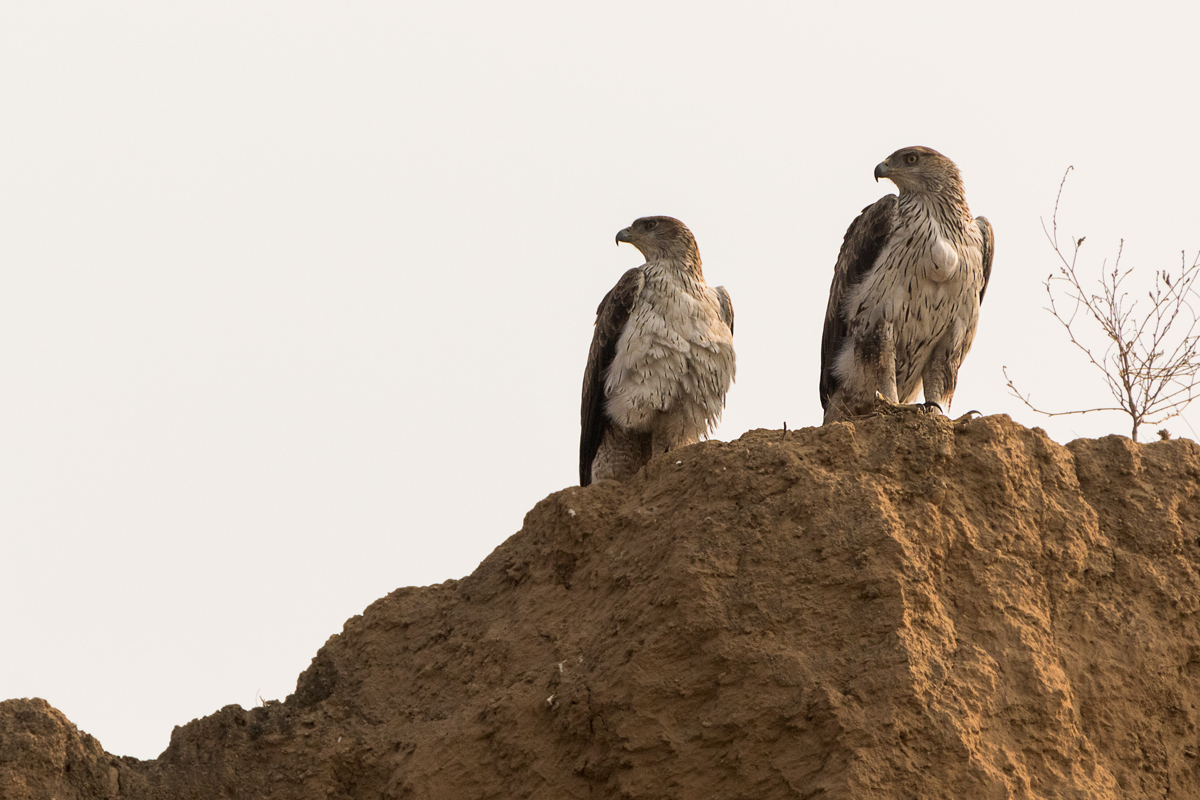
Paired Bonelli's eagles

=== Nests ===
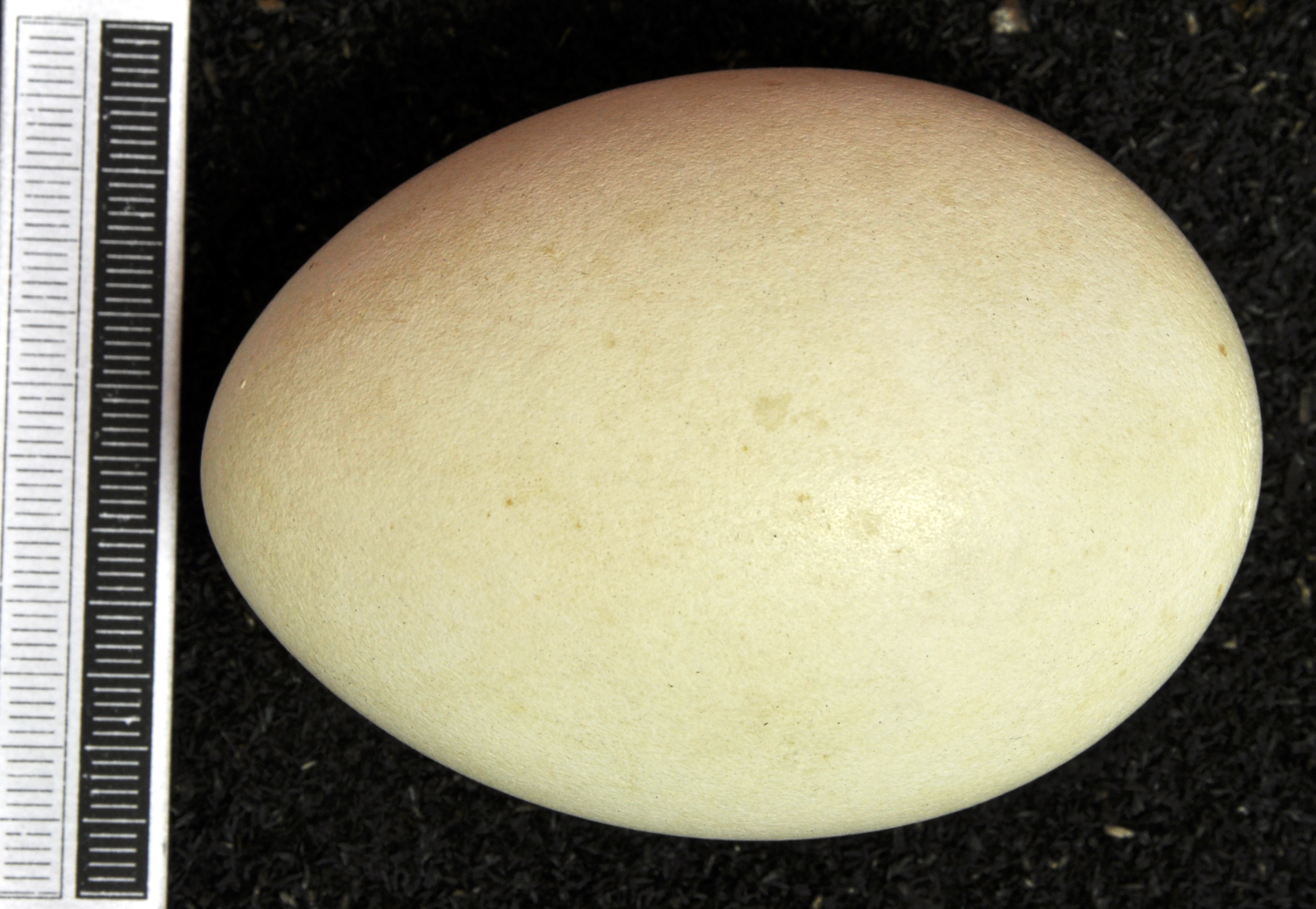
A Bonelli's eagle's egg, from the collection Museum Wiesbaden

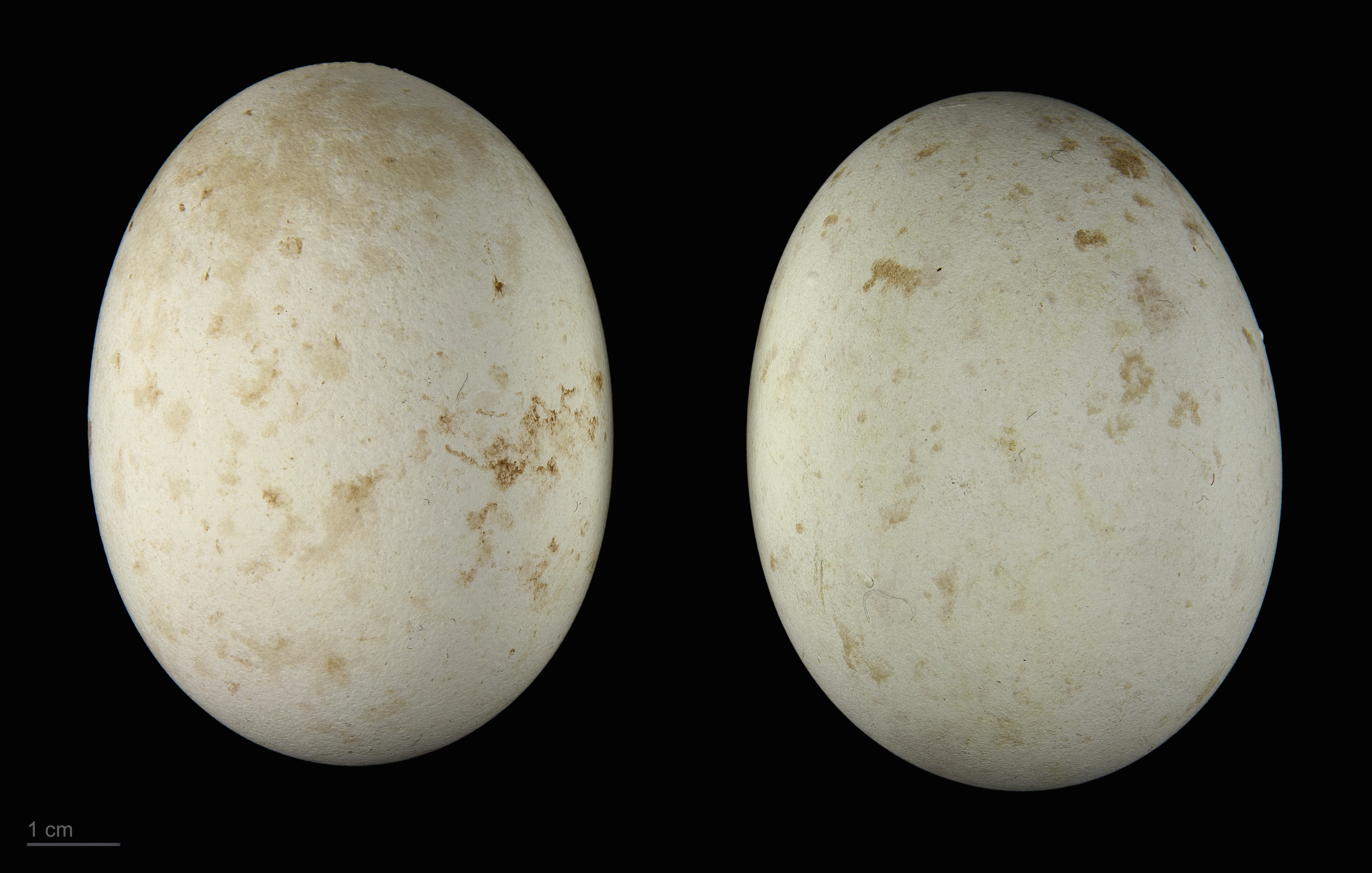
Aquila fasciata – MHNT

The breeding season of Bonelli's eagles is from late January/February to July in the western part of the range and November–August/September (peaking December–May) in the Indian subcontinent and Myanmar. Both members of the pair may dwell around the eyrie for up to 2–3 months before breeding. Their nest is a huge structure of branches and sticks, scarcely smaller than those built by eagles twice the size of this species, though rarely as great in depth as some old nests of the larger eagles. Often the nest completely obscures the sitting female from view unless it is seen at the same level or higher than the nest. Nest size can average up to 1.8 m (5 ft 11 in) across and 60 cm (24 in) deep but with repeated use the nest can range up to 2 m (6 ft 7 in) in both directions (record sized nest in India was 2.4 m (7 ft 10 in) in height). Tree nests tend to average larger than those placed on cliff ledges. One nest in the Gir forest was used periodically used over the course of 30 years. While they may line their active nest with greenery, it is less frequent and sparser where present than in many other birds of prey.

Nesting locales are often high on cliff ledge or alternatively at 5 to 40 m (16 to 131 ft) (usually over 10 m (33 ft)) above the ground in large trees. Very rarely, nests may be on the perimeter of buildings. The trees selected are often the tallest and/or most densely foliaged in a given stand. Their close cousin, the African hawk-eagle, usually nests on trees and rarely utilizes crags and alternate nesting sites as does Bonelli's. Historically, throughout their range in western Europe, Bonelli's eagles were considered almost obligate cliff nesters on almost any rocky environment, from precipitous mountain ranges, canyons over river valleys, even down to low rocky rubble to sea cliffs. However, up to 52 tree nests for the species have now been recorded in southwest Portugal. Often the Portuguese nesting eagles used invasive Tasmanian blue gum (Eucalyptus globulus) (44.2% of the time) while a further 21.2% were on cork oak (Quercus suber) not to mention some that were placed on large shrubs, i.e. strawberry trees (Arbutus unedo). The mean height of Portuguese tree nest was 23.9 m (78 ft). The Portuguese study further found 67.3% of the tree nests to be on hill slopes and 4.5 m (15 ft) average height for lowest branch, both presumably as anti-predator measure. By 2017, the expansion to using tree nests had bolstered the southwest Portugal population considerably. In the 1990s, the first ever tree nest was found in the relative Bonelli's eagle stronghold of Catalonia, Spain, while another singular tree nest was also found in the south of France.

In India, Bonelli's eagles seem to readily switch between tree and cliff nests. The eagles of areas such as Maharashtra and the Western Ghats are usually partial to nesting in trees while in the Deccan Peninsula, Indo-Gangetic Plain and Himalayan foothills, the eagles alternated between nesting on cliffs and lofty trees including red silk cotton (Bombax ceiba), sacred fig (Ficus religiosa), Javan plum (Syzygium cumini) or Dalbergia ssp. Bonelli's eagles in India may also nest close to human habitations if disturbance is low, such as in Saurashtra and in Himalayan foothills, in the latter often in large chir pine (Pinus roxburghii) near villages. In Pakistan, the species has been known to use seaside cliffs. Also, in the Indian desert zone, Bonelli's eagles are known to use relatively low rocky hills with shallow gradients, making the nest ledges relatively easy to access. On Cyprus, 70% of nests were in Turkish pines (Pinus brutia) at a mean elevation of 625 m (2,051 ft). Often this eagle uses the same nest in successive years but also alternate nest may be used. Often somewhere between 1 and 5 nests may be built by the species on their home range. Like other birds of prey, the presence of alternate nest may be a strategy to cope with ectoparasitic infestations within the nest. The construction of a new nest takes roughly a month's time.

=== Development of young ===
The clutch size is usually 2, though one egg is not infrequently laid. This species seldom lays three eggs, though there are now a few records of this and even three large eaglets recorded in a nest. Their eggs are largely white but are often sparingly spotted and streaked with brown. In a sample of 120, egg height was measured as 62 to 76.5 mm (2.44 to 3.01 in), with an average of 69 mm (2.7 in) by 48 to 57.3 mm (1.89 to 2.26 in) in diameter, with an average of 54 mm (2.1 in). Egg laying dates peak from February to April in France, January in North Africa while in India, the peak may be December to April, sometimes even into May (as in the Himalayas). Incubation lasts for 37 to 41 days in Europe but is estimated at a more prolonged 40–45 days in the more tropical Indian subcontinent. Incubation is mainly done by the female (about 90% of the time) while males mainly capture food. Upon hatching, the eaglets are altricial initially. The first feathers start appearing through the white down at 25–35 days and practically cover the body by 45 days. By the latter stage, the eaglets can normally feed themselves but may be variable in learning ability. Fledgling period is at 56 to 65 days of age (rarely as late as 70 days). The average age at fledging in Spain was estimated at 63 days.

Female broods about 90% of the time for first two weeks after first hatching but this decreases to 50% by the end of those weeks. The female attacks potential predators that come near the nest including other raptors. In the Indian subcontinent, they have been seen to escort oriental honey buzzards, crested serpent eagles (Spilornis cheela), bearded vultures, as well as Gyps vultures, conspecifics and corvids away from the eyrie vicinity while the presence of northern plains grey langurs (Semnopithecus entellus) was observed to provoke a fierce defensive attack. However, unlike African hawk-eagles, Bonelli's eagles rarely attack humans at the nest. Males at times have been observed to take a share of the brooding and rarely even feeding the eaglet(s). Caches of food are often stored early on but are quickly depleted and rarely still present latter in the nesting period when the eaglets growth accelerates. The female lingers near nest even after brooding stage. However, the female also tends to take part in prey capture relatively early in fledging period compared to many other eagles. In the latter third of the post-fledging period, the parents are rarely in attendance except when bringing food. The dependence of the young eagles may extend for about 8 to 11 weeks, but has individually varied from 50 to over 120 days. Research on conditions and habitat composition has indicated variation in the post-fledgling dependence stage is derived from habitat quality or from parental skill. However, fledgling body condition seemed to play no major role in this stage. On evidence, the young eagles drift from their parents care independently.

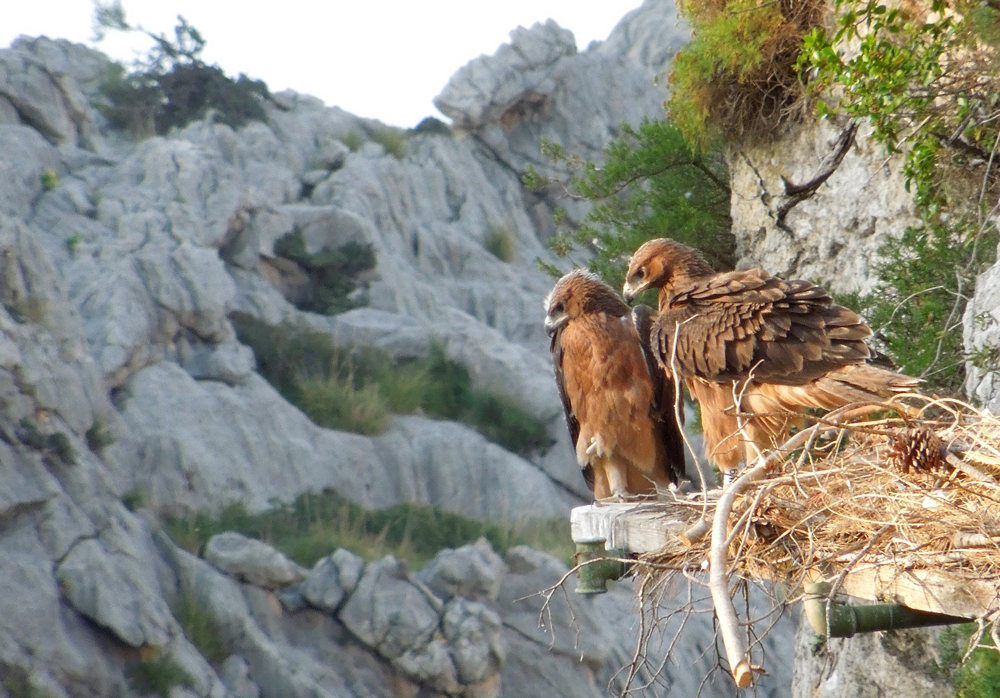
Fully fledged juvenile eagles lingering in the vicinity of their nest.

=== Post-breeding ===
One of the most significant portions of Bonelli's eagles lifecycle is the dispersal stage. The dispersal and post-dispersal stage has been studied at length in western Europe, with a surprising amount of individual variation being found. Here, dispersal occurred at an average age of 142 days (occasionally up to 163 days old) with a varying distance of dispersal from nest to settlement area were from 50 to 536 km (31 to 333 mi). The average distance of dispersal in France was 158 km (98 mi). Anywhere from 58% of 47 to 87% of 7 juveniles survived per these radio-tagged studies. The high distance dispersal of the juvenile Bonelli's eagles may potentially benefit gene flow. At least 20 communal roosts for post-dispersal juvenile Bonelli's eagles were found in Spain. Each were found to house between 2 and 11 eagles of the species, with mean of 5.1. It was also found the juveniles were usually sharing many of the roosts with Spanish imperial eagle juveniles as well (in 91.4% of roost) though each species clustered separately in different parts of the trees or bushes. More infrequently, assorted other species of raptor would join the juvenile eagle roosts at dusk.

=== Breeding success and causes of failures ===
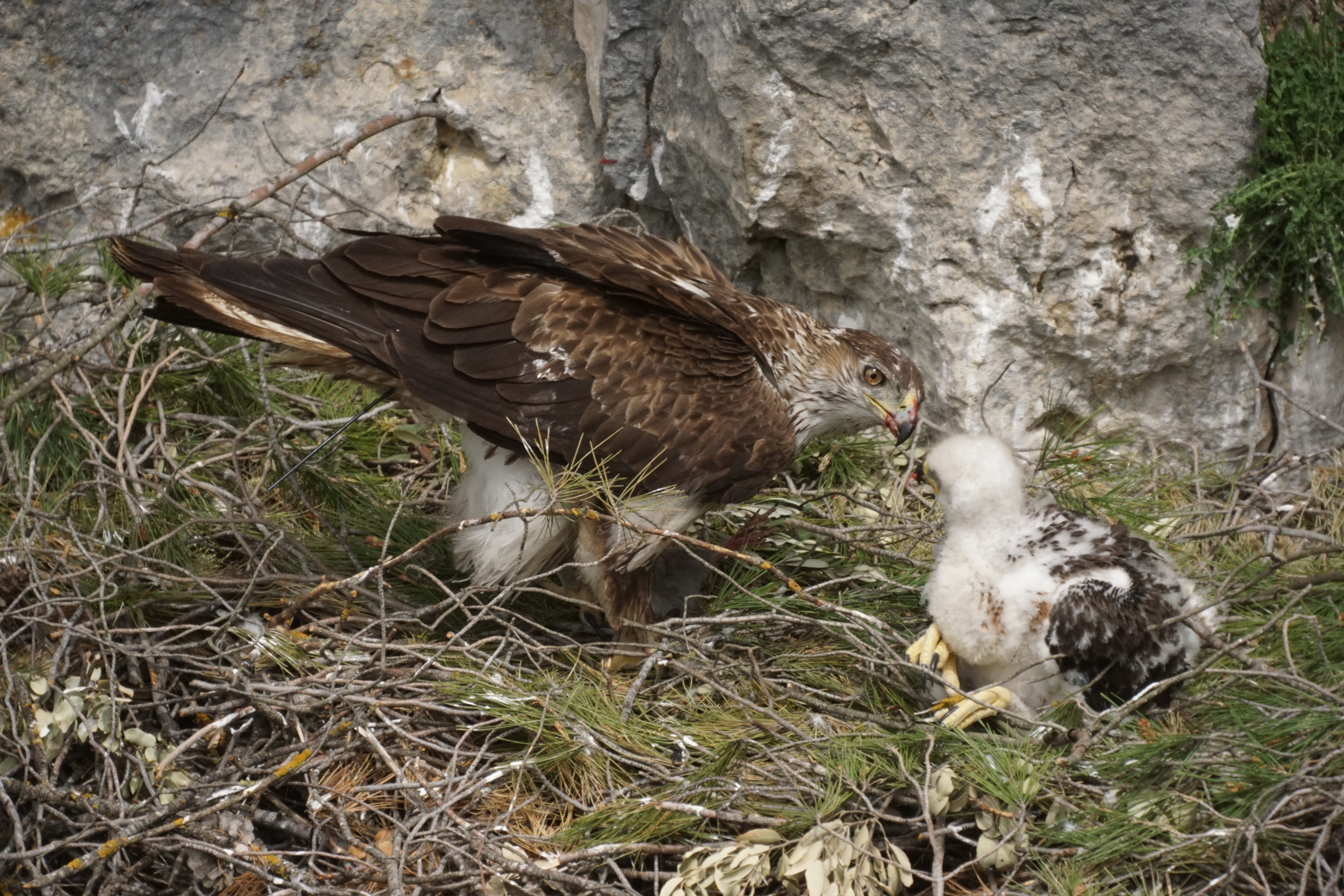
Bonelli's eagle feeding its eaglet with a partridge.

The breeding success of Bonelli's eagles may vary considerably. Mean fledgling success on Cyprus was found to be 1.44 per pair. In Sicily, breeding success was found to vary 0.67 (in the 1990s) to 1.37 (in the 2000s after some protection) and productivity of successful pairs was from 1.42 (2000s) to 1.51 (1990s). Of 1506 breeding attempts in western Europe, 65.7% were successful. Of these successful ones, 39.8% produced one fledgling, 59.7% produced two and only 0.5% produced three fledglings. Like many birds of prey, siblicide or cainism has occurred, wherein the eldest nestling repeatedly attacks, often killing and occasionally eating their younger siblings. In about 20% of nest, the second chick survives, therefore this species is classed as a facultative cainist rather than an obligate one. On evidence, egg laying and hatching may grow more asynchronous when frequently interrelated outside stressors such as food supply, habitat disturbance and poor weather are applied, all of which may increase the likelihood of cainism. Whether the young have died by siblicide or via other means, Bonelli's eagles have been known to consume their own dead nestlings on a couple of occasions. On evidence, the younger eaglets of Bonelli's eagles and other species in areas where threatened may too survive by human intervention, wherein they remove the chicks and either raise them in semi-captivity or introduce them to a new set of parents.

In India, habitat and the resulting prey composition were found to be the most significant drivers of breeding success. In protected areas such as Ranthambore National Park, nest often produce two fledglings, while in degraded areas such as the Kumaun division, they often produce just one. Fledgling number here was thought to be driven primarily by prey carrying capacity of a given area. When an almost fledged young was stolen by village children in India, 15 hours later, researchers introduced another which was accepted by parents. In a similar case, another Indian pair rejected its own nearly fledged eaglet after it had been stolen, however with repeated attempts was accepted and successfully fledged. When poachers stole some eagles in Spain, a couple of pairs were found to successfully lay replacement clutches (each with the typical 2 eggs) some 25–30 days later. A western European review of 1052 breeding attempts indicated a negative correlation with colder temperatures and heavier rains during nesting. Therefore, in more temperate areas such as northern Spain, the average breeding success was lower and the young often dispersed southwards due to the cooler climate.

== Conservation and rehabilitation ==
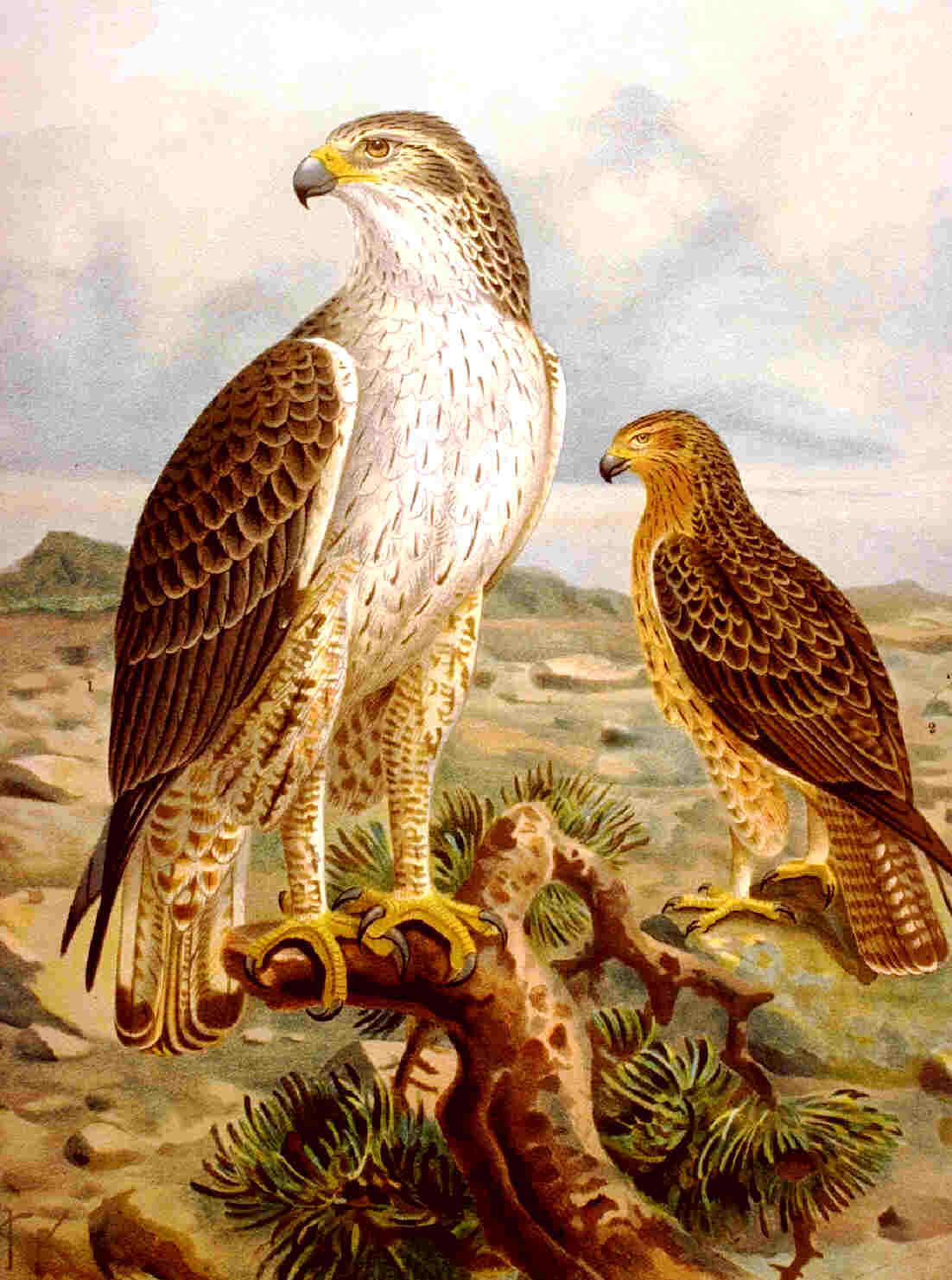
Artwork from a 19th-century German Natural History book

Bonelli's eagles have sharply declined, at least locally inexorably and drastically, in much of their range. In the 1990s, it was estimated that the entire west Palearctic held about 2000–3000 pairs with the Iberian peninsula (750–845 pairs) and northwestern Africa (1000 or so) being the core areas. In the mid-1990s, it was indicated that there were 938–1039 pairs in all of Europe, about 75–80% of which in Spain with an estimated 75–90 in Portugal, 35–45 in Greece, 29 in France, 15–20 in Italy, and a handful each in Croatia and Albania. By the 2000s, with some continued declines and minor local recoveries (as well as more comprehensive surveying) resulted in an estimate of 1500 pairs in Europe, still far less than historic numbers (at least a 30% reduction since the 1950s) and qualifying the species for local critically endangered status. Local extinction is probable in many if not all populations yet there is no overarching action plan for conserving the species. On evidence, populations in core protected areas have increased but fringe areas, important especially to vagrant juveniles, continue to show strong declines and high mortality rates. Although listed today on the IUCN Red List as breeding species there, Bonelli's eagle may be extinct as a nesting species in Bosnia and Herzegovina.

As of 2010, 20 to 22 breeding territories have been found in Sicily and it was thought that this population holds about 95% of the remaining Italian population. Sicilian eagles per study were shown to have high adult mortality (10.2%) and at least 17 pairs in 2010 failed to breed altogether. In their Spanish stronghold, the species has declined or disappeared in 27 out of 40 provinces since 1980, with over 20% reduction in north and central parts. The coastal sierras of east and south Iberia hold highest European densities at 1 pair per 100–200 km^{2} (39–77 sq mi), but once formerly it held a pair per 60 km^{2} (23 sq mi) in the 1970s. In the Region of Murcia, Spain, Bonelli's eagle was considered the second most threatened raptor species, behind only the lesser kestrel. In the Province of Burgos in northern Spain the number of pairs reduced from 25–27 to 10 between 1980 and 1996. Of 100 breeding attempts from 1988 to 1996, only 0.3 were successful and average success rate was only 0.35, despite surplus feeding beginning after 1992. From 200 or more pairs in Greece in the early 1980s, the population has fallen to less than 50. What was roughly estimated to be about 50 pairs (estimated earlier at up to 100), in Turkey in the late 1980s to the 1990s, has recently been revised based on research to only 20–35 pairs in isolated small pockets.

In Israel, 28 pairs of Bonelli's eagle were known to be present in 1989 but little information has been obtained from the rest of Middle East and from Asia. Israeli populations are estimated to have been halved in size. By 2001, only 15 pairs were known to breed in Israel. Besides the four species that have become locally extinct in Israel, it is likely that Bonelli's eagle is the most endangered Israeli raptor. It was estimated that the maximum number in Asia is likely around 35,000 pairs but it could be well less than half of that. Perhaps the only factor preventing authorities such as the IUCN Red List from uplisting Bonelli's eagle to a more severe status is due to lack of extensive research on their population in the Asian range. Strong declines in Asia may be occurring as well. A bird survey of a large area of Uttarakhand, India where the species was historically present failed to find any signs of remaining Bonelli's eagles. In Gujarat, India, an analysis from the 1990s determined that the species was increasingly scarce due to human disturbance and logging.

In multiple parts of the range, certainly in western Europe as well as Cyprus, Bonelli's eagles face a high degree of persecution by hunters, gamekeepers and pigeon-fanciers. Shooting and poisoning of this species persist extensively into the 21st century. Habitat alteration and destruction (e.g. development of roads, intensified agriculture, irrigation of dry fields) in addition to reduced prey numbers and human disturbance in the nesting area are ongoing and increasing threats everywhere for this eagle. Even human activity such as large quantities of people on holiday has been shown to have a negative effect on this eagle as they may alter their range to avoid such activity. From 1990 to 1996, 424 dead Bonelli's eagles in Spain were recorded, 55% died due to electrocution and 26% due to poisoning and shooting. Adults were mainly killed via persecution whereas most juveniles died by electrocution. In Catalonia and central Spain, 50% and 86% due to electrocution whereas persecution was more major in Levante and Green Spain (accounting for 52% and 43% of deaths). Abandonment of territories could not be correlated to interspecific competition but was linked to human influence and persecution.

In Sicily, the main threats are thought to be habitat fragmentation and intensifying agriculture. Previously egg-collectors were semi-regularly exacerbating the reduction of the species on Sicily, but this behaviour has seemingly declined mercifully in recent years. Given its relative scarcity in Crete, only a small number of Bonelli's eagles were recovered dead from persecution when compared to other raptors. However, death through shooting and poisoning is surely not sustainable given the low population there. Increasing overhead power line collisions resulting in electrocution from highly dangerous pylons are a major cause of mortality, resulting in unsustainably high population turnover. In one Spanish study area, 56% of juveniles and 13% of adults were killed by electrocution. In France, 44% of radio-tagged post-dispersal juveniles were killed by electrocution. Wind farms in Spain are a potential growing source of changed territories and deaths for Bonelli's eagles but they are likely to be less effected locally than golden eagles. Lead poisoning from bullets in injured small game, which have been associated with high lead levels in eagle feathers in several parts of their range. Research from western Europe and northeastern Africa has indicated low genetic diversity in these populations, which cause concerns of a population bottleneck for the species in these former strongholds.

=== Conservation efforts ===
Research has indicated that the most significant predicted cause to a strong recovery for Bonelli's eagles in Europe would be conservation of appropriate habitats, followed by higher survival rates for territorial and non-territorial eagles. It was suggested in 2008 that reducing risk of electric powerline collisions and reducing persecution are the most immediate and significant measures that should be taken to retain Bonelli's eagles in Spain. Research indicated that 99% of avian mortality would be reduced by modifying only 27% of the pylons in areas inhabited by the eagles. As reported by 2015, biologists in coordination with local authorities started to properly insulate dangerous powerlines in green areas in order to help converse this and other threatened birds. It was shown that the local population growth rates increased quickly as a result (from 0.82 to 0.98). However, this study showed an apparent increase of anthropogenic mortality from other causes, such as car collisions, in sync with reduced electrocution. It was estimated that for stage of 2008–2014, 0.28 and 0.64 of mortality was still due to electrocution for territorial and non-territorial eagles. In further efforts to converse the species locally, Spanish researchers have provided supplemental feedings to these eagles, which may improve their odds of successfully producing young.
