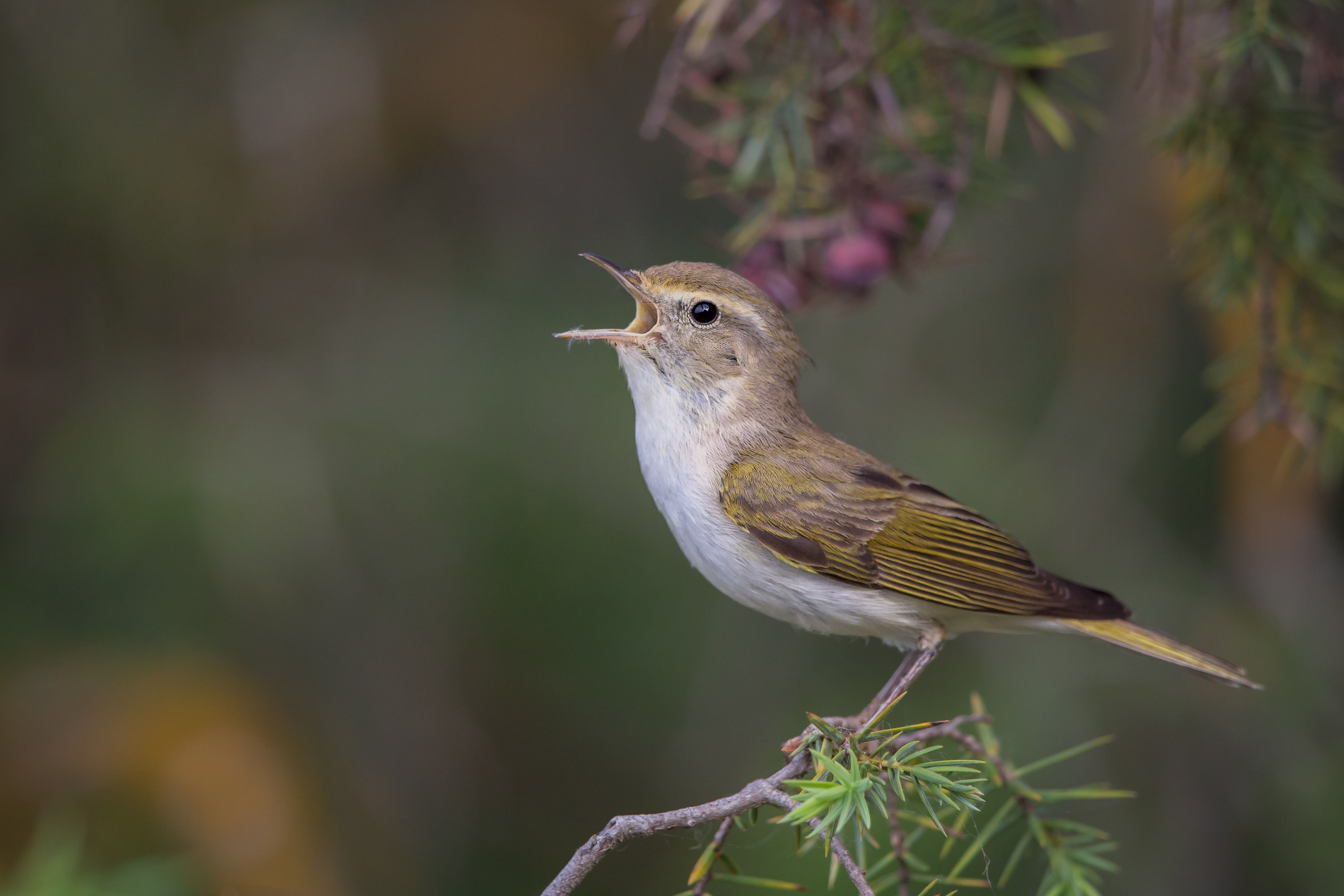

Conservation status
- Least Concern (IUCN 3.1)

Scientific classification
- Kingdom: Animalia
- Phylum: Chordata
- Class: Aves
- Order: Passeriformes
- Family: Phylloscopidae
- Genus: Phylloscopus
- Species: P. bonelli

Binomial name
- Phylloscopus bonelli (Vieillot, 1819)
- Range of P. bonelli Breeding Passage Non-breeding

= Western Bonelli's warbler =

Species of bird

The western Bonelli's warbler (Phylloscopus bonelli) is a warbler in the leaf warbler genus Phylloscopus. It was formerly regarded as the western subspecies of a wider "Bonelli's warbler" species, but as a result of modern taxonomic developments, they are now usually considered to be two species:

- Western Bonelli's warbler, Phylloscopus bonelli, which breeds in southwest Europe and north Africa
- Eastern Bonelli's warbler, Phylloscopus orientalis, which breeds in southeast Europe and Asia Minor

The breeding ranges of the two species do not overlap; while their appearance and songs are very similar, the calls are completely different (see below). They also show marked differences in mtDNA sequence.

The species is migratory, wintering in sub-Saharan Africa. It is a rare vagrant in Northern Europe.

The genus name Phylloscopus is from Ancient Greek phullon, "leaf", and skopos, "seeker" (from skopeo, "to watch"). The English name and the specific bonelli are for the Italian ornithologist Franco Andrea Bonelli.

== Description ==
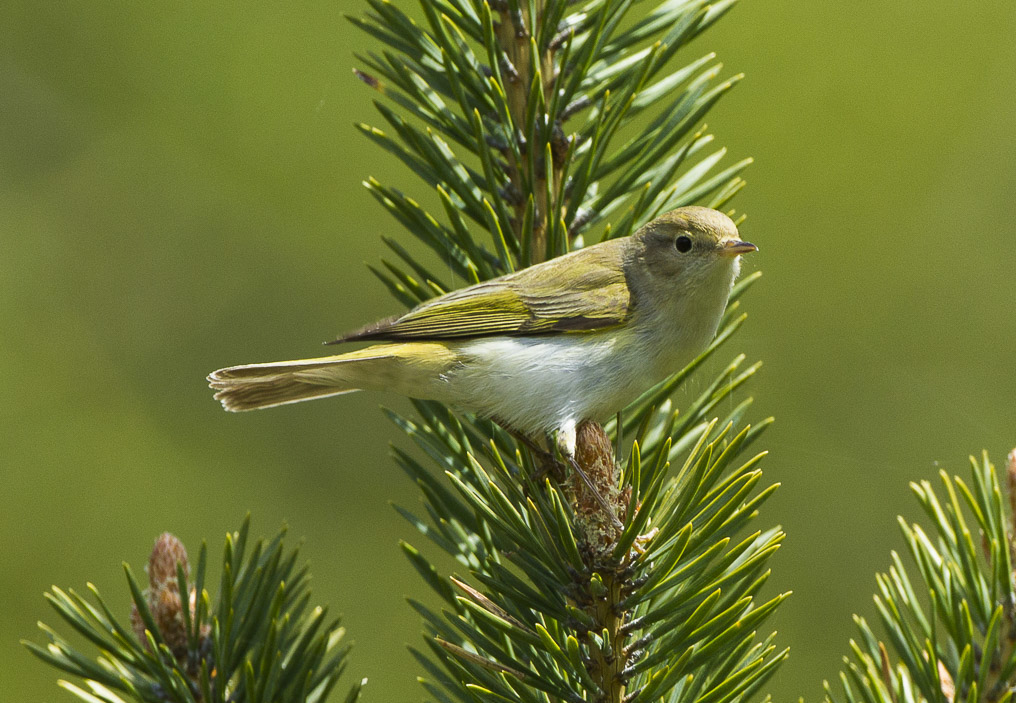
Western Bonelli's warbler at Aosta Valley, Italy

Western Bonelli's warbler is a small passerine bird, found in forest and woodland. Four to six eggs are laid in a nest on the ground. The eggs are white with reddish-brown markings and are laid in clutches of 3-5 eggs. The incubation period is around 14 days long, and the chicks fledge after 10-14 days. Cuckoo nest predation and brood parasitism are major hazards to the breeding success of western Bonelli's warblers. Like most warblers, western Bonelli's warbler is insectivorous.

The adult has a plain grey-green back, green-toned rump and wings and whitish underparts. The bill is small and pointed and the legs brown. The sexes are identical, as with most warblers.

The western Bonelli's warbler has a browner tinge to the upperparts than the eastern Bonelli's warbler; the latter sometimes has a greenish tinge instead. The song is a fast monotone trill, only slightly different from eastern Bonelli's, and also with some similarity to the wood warbler. The call of the western Bonelli's warbler is a disyllabic hu-it, differing from that of the eastern Bonelli's warbler which is a hard chup, reminiscent of a crossbill or a house sparrow.

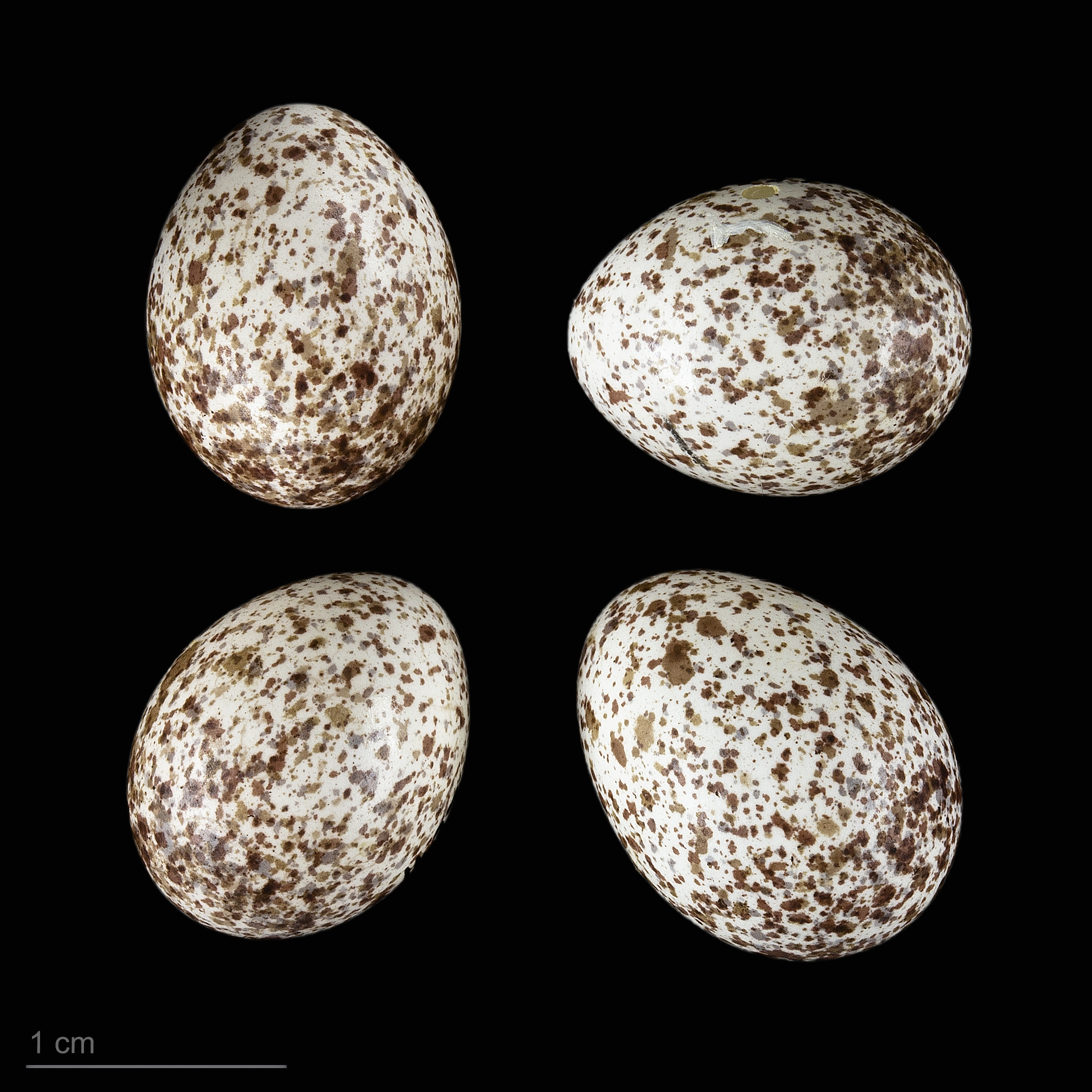
Phylloscopus bonelli - MHNT
