= Franco Andrea Bonelli =

Italian ornithologist and entomologist (1784–1830)

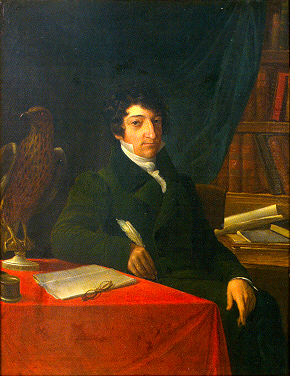
- Painting by Giovanni Battista Biscarra
- Born: 10 November 1784; Cuneo, Italy
- Died: 18 November 1830 (aged 46)
- Education: National Museum of Natural History, France
- Known for: Catalogue of the Birds of Piedmont, discovery of Bonelli's warbler and Bonelli's eagle
- Scientific career
- Fields: Ornithology, Entomology
- Workplaces: University of Turin
- Author abbrev. (zoology): Bonelli

Franco Andrea Bonelli (10 November 1784 – 18 November 1830) was an Italian ornithologist, entomologist and collector. He worked at the University of Turin and was involved in organising the collections of the natural history museum. Bonelli's warbler (now split into two species) and Bonelli's eagle are named after him.

== Life ==
Very little is known about the early life of Bonelli: he was born in Cuneo in a wealthy family. He went to study in Fossano and Turin. He was interested from an early age in the fauna which surrounded him, making collecting trips, preparing specimens and noting his observations. He corresponded with Michele Spirito Giorna at the University of Turin, the Genoan entomologist Maximilian Spinola, and the French naturalists Latreille and Cuvier.

He became a member of the Reale Società Agraria di Torino in 1807 when he presented his first studies relating to the Coleoptera of Piedmont. The high quality of these studies attracted the interest of the naturalists of his time.

In April 1810, George Vat was sent to Turin by the French government to reorganise the University of Turin and begin its fusion with the Impériale University founded by Napoleon. The zoology position became vacant with the death of Michele Spirito Giorna. Vat was very impressed by Bonelli's knowledge. Vat encouraged him to further his knowledge by coming to follow courses at the Natural History Museum in Paris.

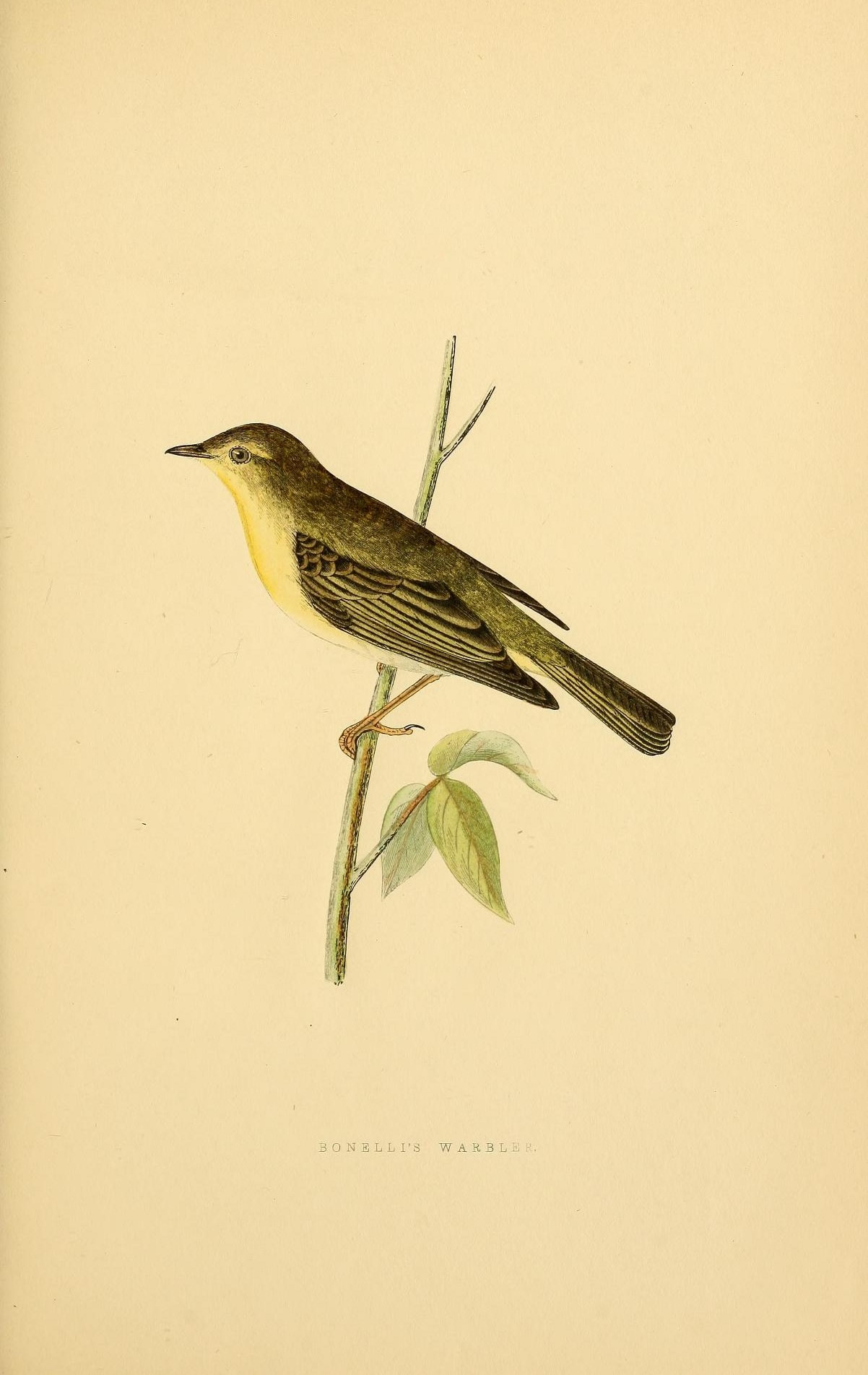
Bonelli's warbler is named after Franco Andrea Bonelli

Bonelli took this advice so as to obtain a professor's chair in the new university. In September 1810, he arrived in Paris.

In 1811, Bonelli was finally named professor of zoology at the University of Turin and keeper of the Natural History Museum of Zoology. During his time at the university, he formed one of the largest ornithological collections in Europe.

In 1811, Bonelli wrote a Catalogue of the Birds of Piedmont, in which he described 262 species. In 1815, he discovered the bird Bonelli's warbler (Phylloscopus bonelli), named by Louis Vieillot in 1819. In the same year, he discovered Bonelli's eagle (Hieraaetus fasciatus), which was likewise named by Vieillot in 1822.

The successor of Bonelli at the Turin Museum was Carlo Giuseppe Gené. His son was Cesare Bonelli Italian Minister of War from 1878-1880.

== Achievements ==
Bonelli is most notable for his work on birds and on the beetle family Carabidae. Since he was an early worker on Coleoptera, many of his genera later became Families, sub families and tribes. Also, many of his genera survive.

Instances are:

- Omophroninae; Pseudomorphinae; Brachininae; Trechinae; Harpalinae; Pseudomorphinae; Siagoninae; Pterostichinae and Scaritinae - Subfamilies
- Dromiidae 1810 Family
- Pterostichini Tribe

== Works ==
- Catalogue des Oiseaux du Piemont (1811).
- Observations Entomologique. Première partie. Mém. Acad. Sci. Turin 18: 21–78, Tabula Synoptica (1810).
- Observations entomologiques. Deuxieme partie. Mém. Acad. Sci. Turin 20: 433-484 (1813)

The last two are founding works of entomology, introducing many new taxa.

== Sources ==
- Achille Casale and Pier Mauro Giachino "Franco Andrea Bonelli (1784-1830), an Entomologist in Turin at the Beginning of the XIX century", in Proceedings of a Symposium (28 August 1996, Florence, Italy). Phylogeny and Classification of Caraboidea. XX International Congress of Entomology, Museo Regionale di Scienze Naturali Torino (1998).
