= Pouakai =

Pouakai or Pouākai may refer to:

- Pouākai, a monstrous bird in Māori mythology
- Haast's Eagle, an extinct bird of New Zealand
- Pouākai Range, an eroded, extinct volcano on the northern flank of Mount Taranaki
