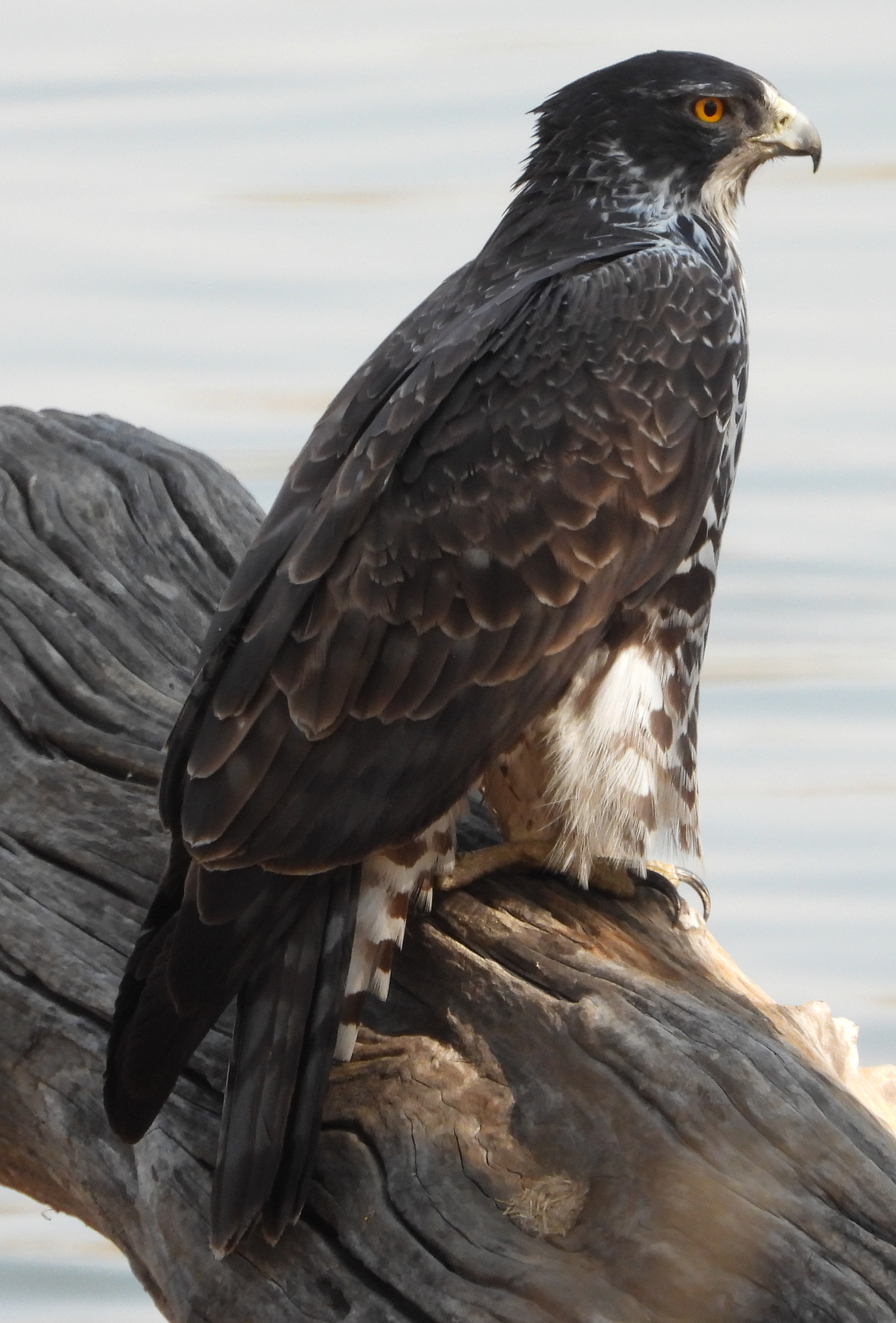

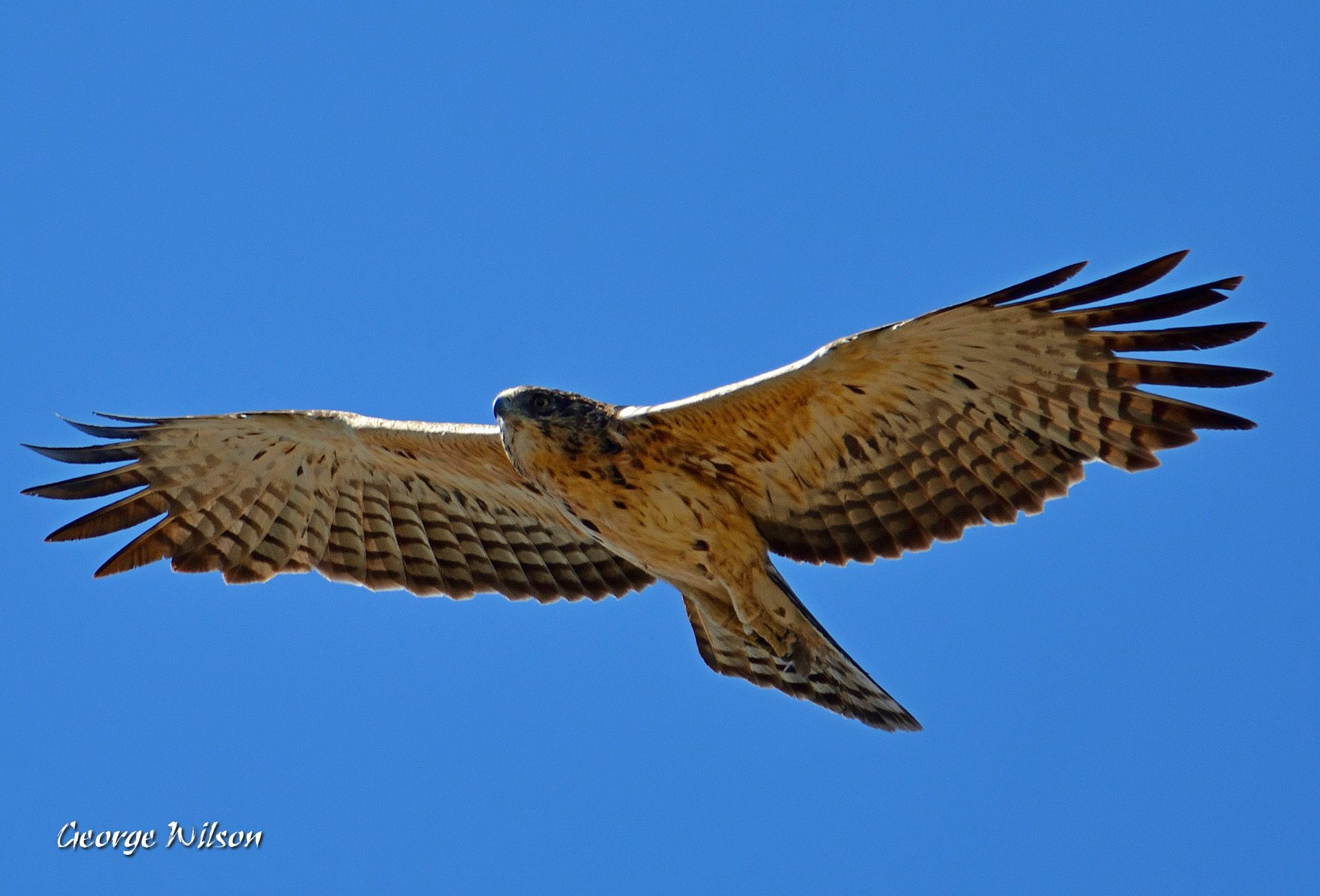

Conservation status
- Least Concern (IUCN 3.1)

Scientific classification
- Kingdom: Animalia
- Phylum: Chordata
- Class: Aves
- Order: Accipitriformes
- Family: Accipitridae
- Genus: Hieraaetus
- Species: H. ayresii

Binomial name
- Hieraaetus ayresii (Gurney, JH Sr, 1862)
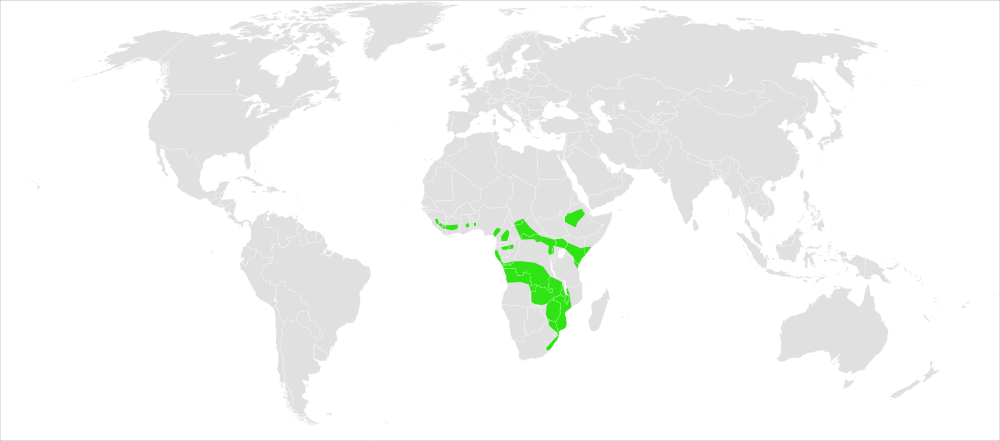
- Ayres's hawk-eagle Range

Synonyms
- Aquila ayresii (Gurney, JH Sr, 1862); Spizaetus ayresi Anomalaetus ayresi Roberts, 1922

= Ayres's hawk-eagle =

Ayres' hawk-eagle

Species of bird

Ayres's hawk-eagle (Hieraaetus ayresii), or Ayres' eagle, is a medium-sized bird of prey in the family Accipitridae. It is native to African woodlands. Its name honours South African ornithologist Thomas Ayres.

== Description ==
The adult male has blackish upper parts that are mottled with white and usually has a white forehead and supercilium. The upper-wing coverts are similar. The tail is ashy grey with a broad black tip and three to four narrower dark bars. Primary feathers and secondary feathers are black. The underparts are white, with heavy dark brown spots and blotches on the breast and belly, becoming sparser on the thighs and vent. The legs are well-feathered and pure white. The under-wing coverts are brown and marked with white, and the underside of flight feathers is dark and heavily barred lacking any noticeable grey patch. The eyes are yellow to orange, the cere and feet yellow, and the bill is bluish horn coloured becoming paler towards the base, with a black tip. This species has a small but at times pronounced crest. The males are smaller than the females, darker and usually more densely spotted on the underparts, and have a smaller amount of white on the forehead and supercilium. There are two phases, the normal as described above and a melanistic phase, which is mostly black with white markings. The juvenile Ayres's hawk-eagle is dark brown on the back and coverts, similarly dark on the crown, slightly paler necked, largely white below from the throat to the crissum and legs with sparse dark brown markings variably along the chest, belly, and flanks. When maturing, the young hawk-eagles often manifest a duskier, browner colour with somewhat of a rufous cast from below before moulting in its mature, adult plumage. Mostly the species is considered confusable with the African hawk-eagle which is larger and lankier with a more protruding head, a longer tail, more sparsely marked underparts, and more heavily marked wings with a white window above. It shares white "landing lights" at the fore of the wings with the similarly sized booted eagle but that species is usually rather differently marked overall (either paler and browner or all dark in dark morphs) and also similarly sized black sparrowhawks are mentioned as a confusion species but sparrowhawks are rather differently proportioned with bare, dull green-yellow legs.

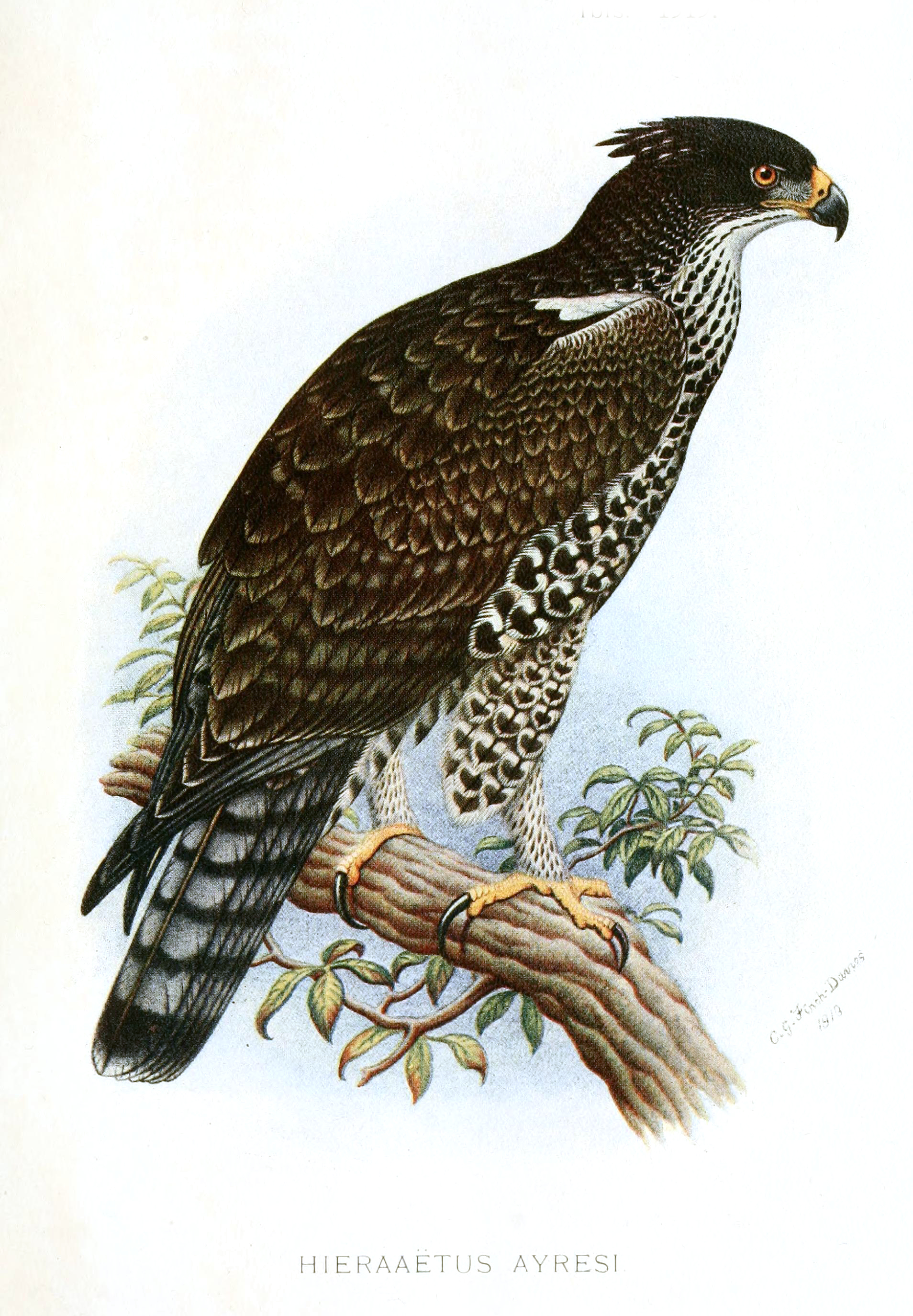
The adult Ayres's hawk-eagle is richly bicolored, having a nearly piebald look with extensive dark speckling on the underbody.

The Ayres's hawk-eagle is a medium-sized raptor but quite a small eagle, about the weight of a peregrine falcon albeit with a slightly greater length and wingspan more akin to a common buzzard, with a total length of 44 to 57 cm (17 to 22 in) and has a wingspan of 106 to 137 cm (3 ft 6 in to 4 ft 6 in). A small sample of males have been known to weigh from 615 to 714 g (1.356 to 1.574 lb) and females weigh from 879 to 1,150 g (1.938 to 2.535 lb). The average weight of four adult males was 662.5 g (1.461 lb) while that of 10 adult females was 1,017.5 g (2.243 lb), juvenile Ayres's being some 5% lighter in spite of slightly greater wing sizes. The wing chord is 326 to 345 mm (12.8 to 13.6 in) and from 360 to 420 mm (14 to 17 in) in males and females, respectively. The tail and tarsus length is from 175 to 185 mm (6.9 to 7.3 in) and from 56 to 62 cm (22 to 24 in) in males and 205 to 223 mm (8.1 to 8.8 in) and from 65 to 80 cm (26 to 31 in) in females. The species thus manifests quite strong sexual dimorphism in favor of the female, which does not overlap in standard measurements with the smaller male. Bill length is from 20 to 31 mm (0.79 to 1.22 in), averaging 21.3 mm (0.84 in) in males and 25.4 mm (1.00 in) in females. The enlarged hallux claw on the rear toe is from 27.9 to 36.3 mm (1.10 to 1.43 in), averaging 29.5 mm (1.16 in) in males and 34.4 mm (1.35 in) in females, quite large for the small size of the eagle.

== Distribution and habitat ==
Ayres's hawk-eagle has a patchy sub-Saharan distribution ranging from Sierra Leone east to Somalia, and south to northern Namibia and northeast South Africa. Its central range is from the southern Democratic Republic of the Congo and southern Uganda down almost throughout Kenya, Tanzania, Zambia and Mozambique as well as much of Angola to northeastern Namibia, northern Botswana and northern Zimbabwe.

In the rainy season moves out of denser and taller deciduous woodlands of central Africa into more open albeit treed savanna habitat further south, and probably into coastal East Africa; as the rains cause the leaves to emerge turning woodland into forests and tree savanna into woodland. It may then enter towns in South Africa to prey mainly on doves and feral pigeons. A similar north to south movement is expected in west Africa, where species has been recorded as a vagrant west to Senegal and Gambia, albeit unconfirmed. It tends to occur around woodlands of Brachystegia and Baikiaea in the core south-central African part of their distribution. It is not typically a forest dwelling species and prefers mature woodland among often irregular, rocky terrain. Occasionally but not regularly they may habituate to Acacia plantations and riparian zones. Ayres's hawk-eagles tend to be rare in hyper arid and, of course, treeless areas.

== Biology ==
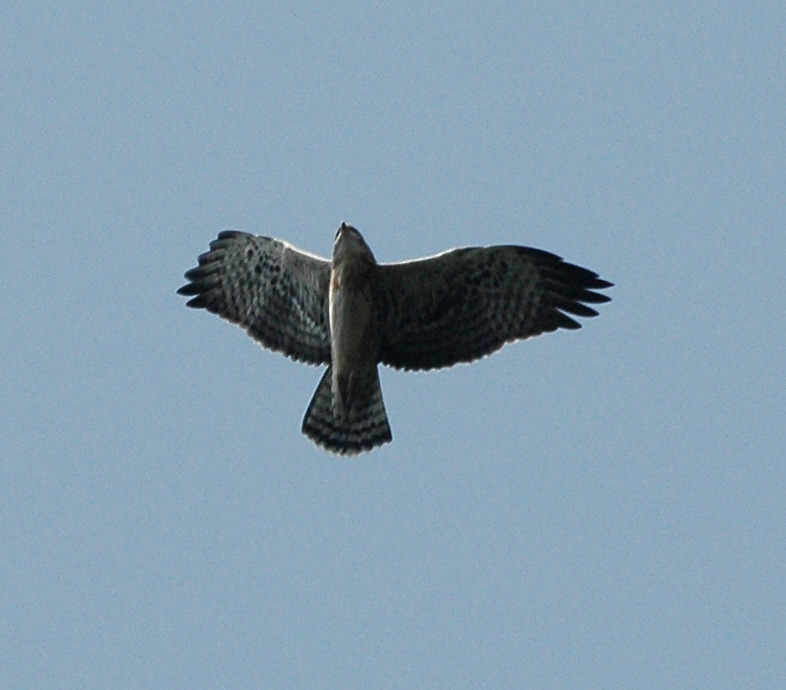
Juvenile in flight

Ayres's hawk-eagle is a bird hunter, almost to the exclusion of any other type of prey, especially doves and pigeons, it soars high above the ground to search for prey. It is unique for a Aquilinae eagle in its falcon-like highly aerial method for hunting birds on the wing, an aptitude it shares with the Asian rufous-bellied eagle. Favoured in diet in some areas are laughing doves and red-eyed doves. Once a bird has been singled out, the eagle stoops to intercept it in mid air. Other than birds it has been recorded as catching a few mammals including bush squirrels, and fruit bats. They are an exceptional agile and fast eagle and can overtake many birds in flight. The Ayres's hawk-eagle predominantly hunt quite small birds, typically weighing from 40 to 200 g (1.4 to 7.1 oz), and can sometimes include nestling birds in their diet. However, it quite commonly takes heavier birds than in the aforementioned weight range, including rock pigeons and African grey hornbills. Sometimes they will overtake birds up to over twice their size including white-faced whistling ducks, assorted francolins and guineafowls and even other birds of prey including gabar goshawks and shikras.

Ayres's hawk-eagle is a monogamous, territorial solitary nester. The nest consists of a large platform of a twigs and sticks, lined with green leaves and typically concealed in the fork within a well-leafed, large tree, usually from 9 to 32 m (30 to 105 ft) above the ground. The nest can be from 60 to 132 cm (24 to 52 in) across. Eggs are laid from April to September, peaking in April and May. A single egg is laid, measuring on average 61.2 by 49.8 mm (2.41 by 1.96 in). The female is almost solely responsible for incubation which takes about 43 days, the male brings her food every two to three days. The chick is fed almost daily, fledging at about 73 days old and becoming fully independent from its parents approximately three months after fledging.

== Conservation status ==
Although Ayres's hawk-eagle is an uncommon bird throughout its range, it is classified as Least Concern (LC) by the IUCN, due to its large range and its numbers, while small, appearing stable at the present time. The estimated global population is only 1000 to 10,000 individuals. The main threat faced by the species is cutting of woodland. Furthermore, it is persecuted at times for hunting down domestic pigeons.
