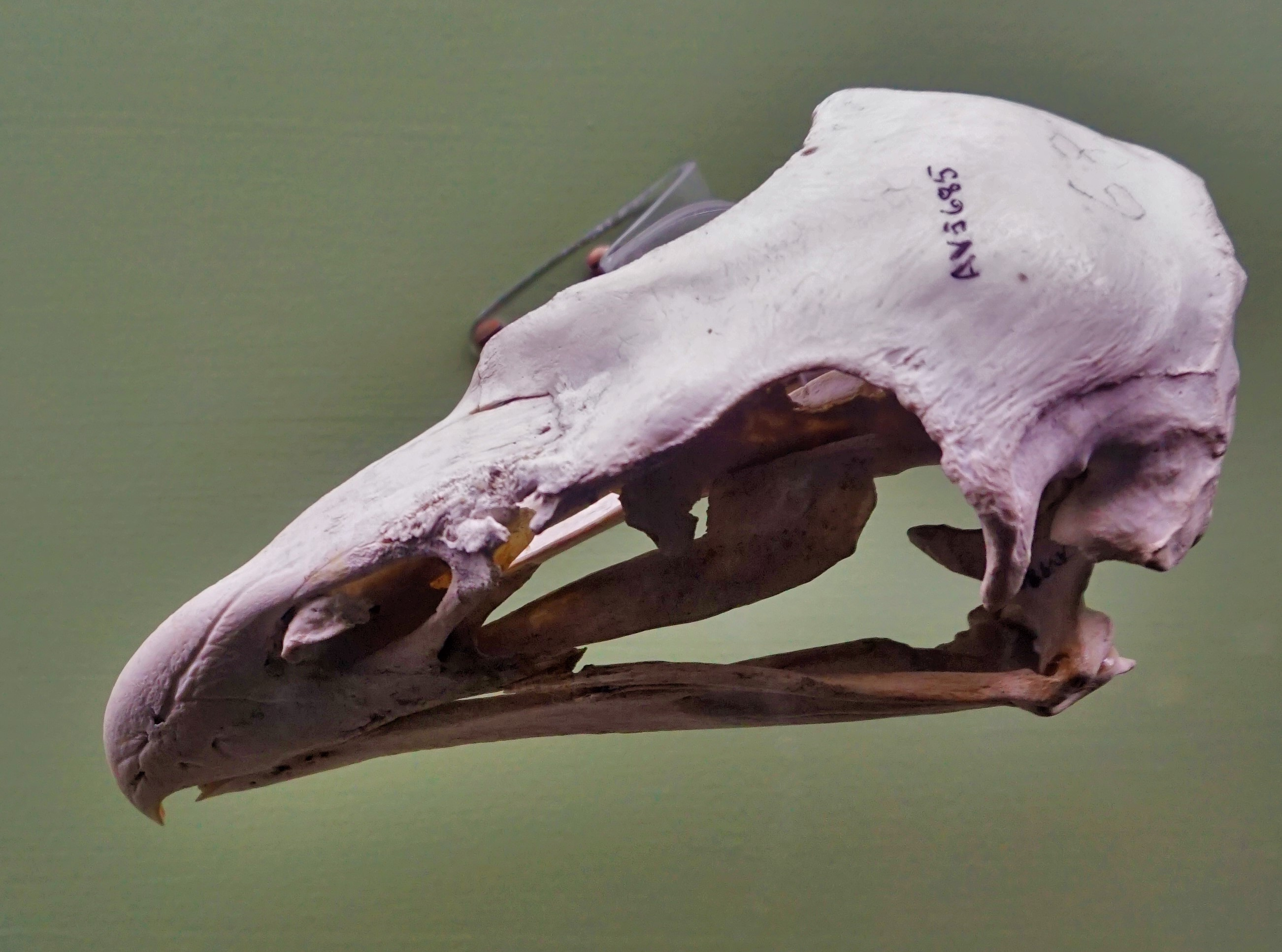
- Skull at the Canterbury Museum, Christchurch

Conservation status
- Extinct (~1400) (NZ TCS)

Scientific classification
- Kingdom: Animalia
- Phylum: Chordata
- Class: Aves
- Order: Accipitriformes
- Family: Accipitridae
- Genus: Hieraaetus
- Species: †H. moorei

Binomial name
- †Hieraaetus moorei (Haast, 1872)

Synonyms
- Aquila moorei Haast, 1872; Harpagornis moorei Haast, 1872

= Haast's eagle =

Haast's eagle Temporal range: Pleistocene to Late Holocene

Extinct species of bird

Haast's eagle (Hieraaetus moorei), sometimes known as Fuller's eagle, is an extinct species of eagle that lived in the South Island of New Zealand, commonly accepted to be the pouākai of Māori mythology. It is the largest eagle known to have existed, with an estimated weight of 10–18 kilograms (22–40 pounds), compared to the next-largest and extant harpy eagle (Harpia harpyja) and Steller's sea eagle (Haliaeetus pelagicus) at up to 9 kg (20 lb). Its massive size is explained as an evolutionary response to the size of its primary prey—the flightless moa—the largest of which could weigh 200 kg (440 lb). Haast's eagle became extinct around 1445, following the arrival of the Māori, who hunted moa to extinction, introduced the Polynesian rat (Rattus exulans), and destroyed large tracts of forest by fire.

== Taxonomy ==
Haast's eagle was first scientifically described by Julius von Haast in 1871 from remains discovered by the Canterbury Museum taxidermist, Frederick Richardson Fuller, in a former marsh.

=== Etymology ===
Haast named the eagle Harpagornis moorei after George Henry Moore, the owner of the Glenmark Estate, where the bones of the bird were found. The genus name was from the Greek harpax, meaning "grappling hook", and ornis, meaning "bird". In an article in 2025, the biologist Richard Holdaway said he had coined the now-conventional common name Haast's eagle in the early 1990s but on later reflection proposes a more suitable name be Fuller's eagle, after its actual discoverer.

=== Evolution ===
DNA analysis later showed that this bird is related most closely to the much smaller little eagle (Hieraaetus morphnoides) as well as the booted eagle (Hieraaetus pennatus) and not, as previously thought, to the large wedge-tailed eagle (Aquila audax). Harpagornis moorei was therefore reclassified as Hieraaetus moorei.

H. moorei is estimated to have diverged from these smaller eagles as recently as 1.8 million to 700,000 years ago. If this estimate is correct, its increase in weight by 10 to 15 times is an exceptionally rapid weight increase. The suggested increase in the average weight of Haast's eagle over that period would therefore represent the largest, fastest evolutionary increase in average weight of any known vertebrate species. This was made possible in part by the presence of large prey and the absence of competition from other large predators, an example of ecological release and island gigantism. A recent mitochondrial DNA study found it to be more closely related to the little eagle than the booted eagle, with an estimated divergence from the little eagle around 2.2 million years ago. It was placed in the genus Aquila by recent taxonomists.

== Description ==
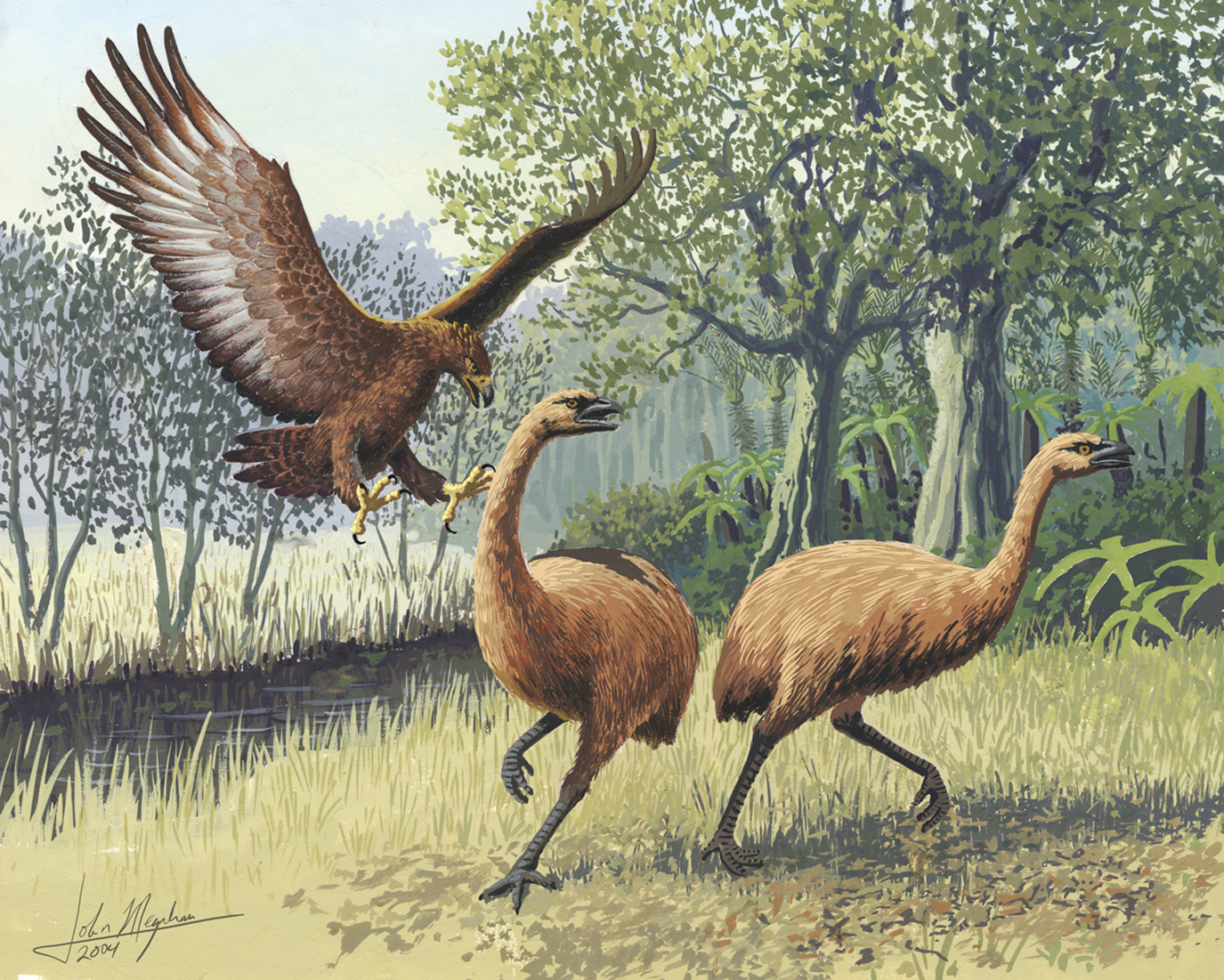
Life restoration of Haast's eagle attacking moa

Haast's eagle was one of the largest known true raptors. In length and weight, it was even larger than the largest living vulture (the Andean condor). Another giant bird (not actually an eagle save for in name) more recently and scantily described from the fossil record, Woodward's eagle, which resided in North America, rivaled Haast's eagle in at least the aspect of total length. Female eagles were larger than males. Most estimates place the female Haast's eagles in the range of 10–18 kg (22–40 lb) and males around 9–12 kg (20–26 lb). A comparison with living eagles of the Australasian region resulted in estimated masses in Haast's eagles of 11.5 kg (25 lb) for males and 14 kg (31 lb) for females. One source estimates that the largest females could have weighed more than 16.5 kg (36 lb). The largest extant eagles, none of which are verified to exceed 9 kg (20 lb) in a wild state, are about forty percent smaller in body size than Haast's eagles.

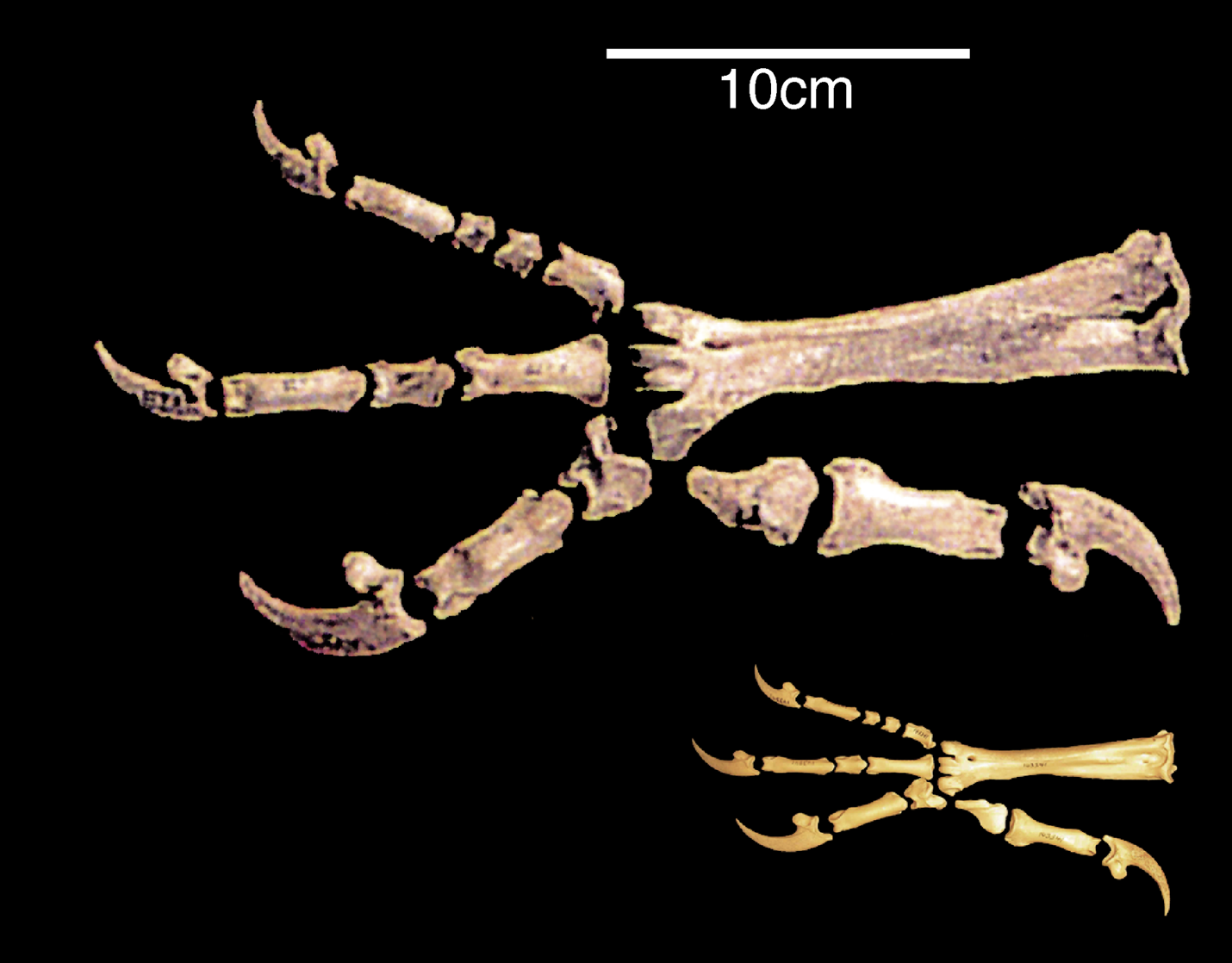
Foot bones of Haast's eagle (top) and those of its closest living relative, the little eagle

It had a relatively short wingspan for its size. It is estimated that the grown female typically spanned up to 2.6 m (8 ft 6 in), possibly up to 3 m (10 ft) in a few cases. This wingspan is broadly similar to the larger range of female size in some extant eagles: the wedge-tailed eagle (A. audax), golden eagle (A. chrysaetos), martial eagle (Polemaetus bellicosus), white-tailed eagle (Haliaeetus albicilla) and Steller's sea eagle (Haliaeetus pelagicus) are all known to exceed 2.5 m (8 ft 2 in) in wingspan. Several of the largest extant Old World vultures, if not in mean mass or other linear measurements, probably exceed Haast's eagle in average wingspan as well. Haast's eagle's relatively short wingspan has sometimes led to it being incorrectly portrayed as having evolved toward flightlessness, even though evidence strongly suggests that it flew. Instead, its short and broad wings represents an evolutionary departure from the mode of its ancestors' soaring flight in favour of navigating through a crowded woodland environment. Haast's eagles are likely to have hunted within the dense shrubland and forests of New Zealand, somewhat akin to other forest-dwelling raptors like the goshawks or harpy eagle.

Some wing and leg remains of Haast's eagles permit direct comparison with living eagles. The harpy eagle, the Philippine eagle (Pithecophaga jefferyi), and the Steller's sea eagle are the largest and most powerful living eagles, and the first two also have a similarly reduced relative wing-length as an adaptation to forest-dwelling. A lower mandible from Haast's eagle measured 11.4 cm (4 1/2 in) and the tarsus in several Haast's eagle fossils has been measured from 13.7 to 16.2 cm (5 3/8 to 6 3/8 in). In comparison, the largest beaks of eagles today (from the Philippine and the Steller's sea eagle) reach a little more than 7 cm (3 in); and the longest tarsal measurements (from the Philippine and the Papuan eagle, Harpyopsis novaeguineae) top out around 14 cm (5 1/2 in).

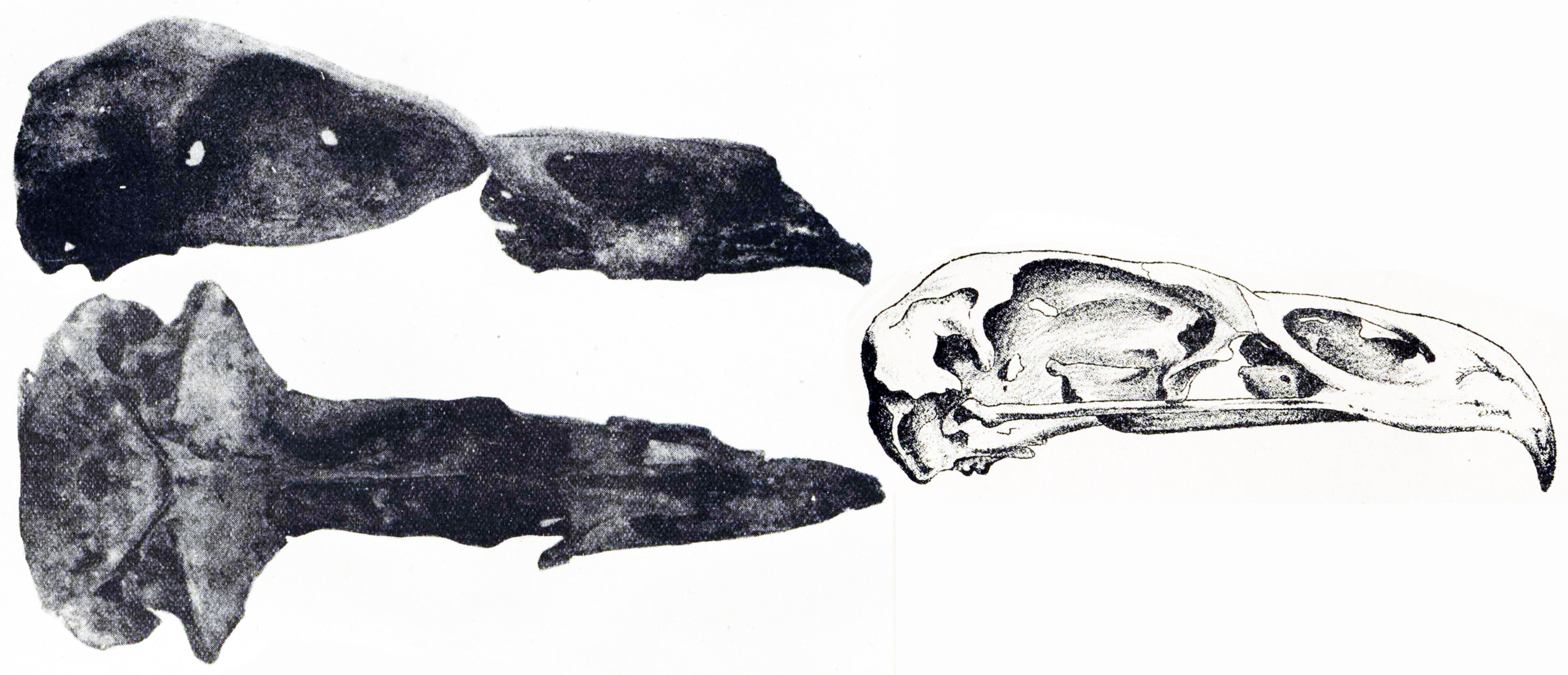
Skull photos and diagram

The talons of Haast's eagle were similar in length to those of the harpy eagle, with a front-left talon length of 4.9 to 6.15 cm (1 15/16 to 2 7/16 in) and a hallux-claw of possibly up to 11 cm (4 1/2 in). The Philippine eagle might be a particularly appropriate living species to compare with Haast's eagle, because it too evolved in an insular environment from smaller ancestors (apparently basal snake eagles) to island gigantism in the absence of large carnivorous mammals and other competing predators. The eagle's talons are similar to modern eagles, suggesting that it used its talons for hunting and not scavenging. The strong legs and massive flight muscles of these eagles would have enabled the birds to take off with a jumping start from the ground, despite their great weight. The tail was almost certainly long, in excess of 50 cm (20 in) in female specimens, and very broad. This characteristic would compensate for the reduction in wing area by providing additional lift. Total length is estimated to have been up to 1.4 m (4 ft 7 in) in females, with a standing height of approximately 90 cm (2 ft 11 in) tall or perhaps slightly greater.

Māori cave art depicts Haast's eagle with a pale head. These Māori rock art drawings can still be found in modern-day South Canterbury near Timaru. Combined with its vulture-like feeding behaviour, this might suggest it had a bald head, or had shorter feathers on its head than elsewhere on its body.

== Behaviour and ecology ==
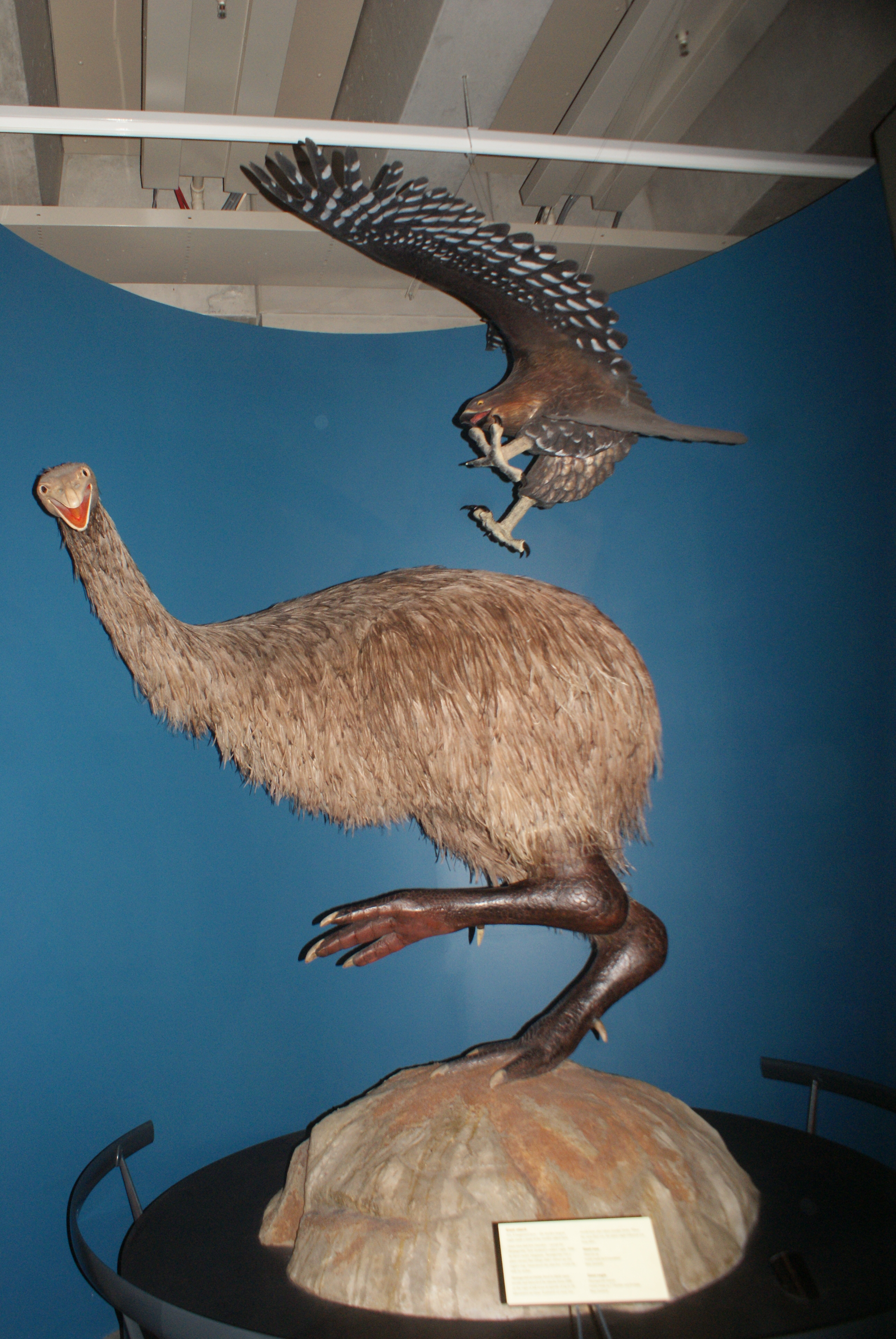
Model at Te Papa of Haast's eagle attacking a moa

Haast's eagle predominantly preyed on large, flightless bird species, including the moa. Moa would be up to fifteen times the weight of the eagle. Its large beak also could be used to rip into the internal organs of its prey, leading to death by blood loss. Due to the absence of other large predators or kleptoparasites, a Haast's eagle could easily have monopolised a single large kill over a number of days. Its prey, the moa, could weigh up to 200 kg (440 lb).

A 2021 analysis showed that, while predatory, the bill of Haast's eagle was functionally closer to that of the Andean condor (Vultur gryphus) than to that of other eagles. This is also supported by historic Māori cave art which depicts Haast's eagle being pale-headed. It also suggests that it deployed feeding tactics more similar to those of vultures after making a kill, plunging its head into the body cavity to devour the vital organs of its prey. This may have been an adaptation to the bird's hunting animals much larger than itself.

== Extinction ==
Until recent human colonisation that introduced rodents and cats, the only placental land mammals found on the islands of New Zealand were three species of bat. Birds occupied or dominated all major niches in the New Zealand animal ecology. Moa were grazers, functionally similar to large ungulates, such as deer or cattle in other habitats, and Haast's eagles were the hunters who filled the same niche as top-niche mammalian predators.

One study estimated the total population of Haast's eagle at 3,000 to 4,500 breeding pairs. Early Māori settlers arrived in New Zealand sometime between AD 1250 and AD 1275, The Māori preyed heavily on large flightless birds, including all moa species. The added hunting pressure from the Māori led the moa to extinction by around 1440 to 1445. Both eagles and Māori likely competed for the same foods. Unlike the adaptable humans, eagles were dependent on the native medium and large-sized flightless birds, being specialised in hunting them. The loss of its primary prey caused Haast's eagle to become extinct at about the same time as its prey.

== Relationship with humans ==
Some believe that these birds are described in many legends of the Māori mythology, under the names pouākai, Hakawai (or Hōkioi in the North Island). According to an account given to George Grey, an early governor of New Zealand, Hōkioi were huge black-and-white birds with yellow-green tinged wings and a red crest. In Māori mythology, Pouākai would prey on and kill humans along with moa, which scientists believe could have been possible if the name relates to the eagle, given the massive size and strength of the bird. However, it has also been argued that the "hakawai" and "hōkioi" legends refer to the Austral snipe—in particular the extinct South Island species. Additionally, it has been suggested that the pouākai is unlikely to refer to Haast's eagle as the species is not known to have been present at North Island.

== In popular culture ==
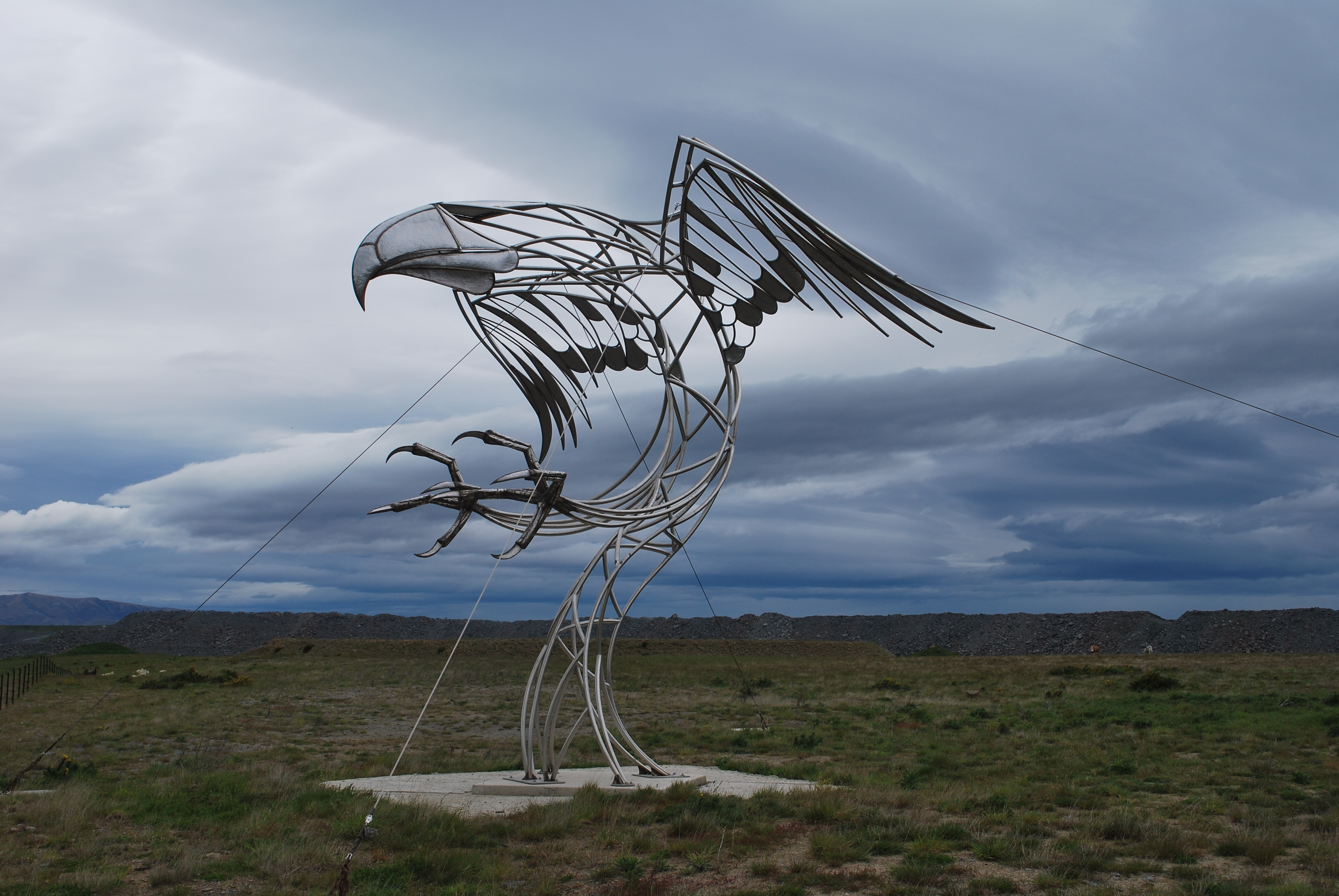
A Haast's eagle statue on Macraes Flat

Artwork depicting Haast's eagle now may be viewed at OceanaGold's Heritage and Art Park at Macraes, Otago, New Zealand. The sculpture, weighing approximately 750 kg (1,650 lb), standing 7.5 metres (25 ft) tall, and depicted with a wingspan of 11.5 metres (38 ft) is constructed from stainless steel tube and sheet and was designed and constructed by Mark Hill, a sculptor from Arrowtown, New Zealand. Haast's eagle also appeared in a 2003 BBC documentary Monsters We Met.

There is also a statue depicting Haast's eagle in Karamea, West Coast. This statue was unveiled by the community and the Ngāti Waewae iwi.

== See also ==
- Island gigantism
- Late Quaternary prehistoric birds
