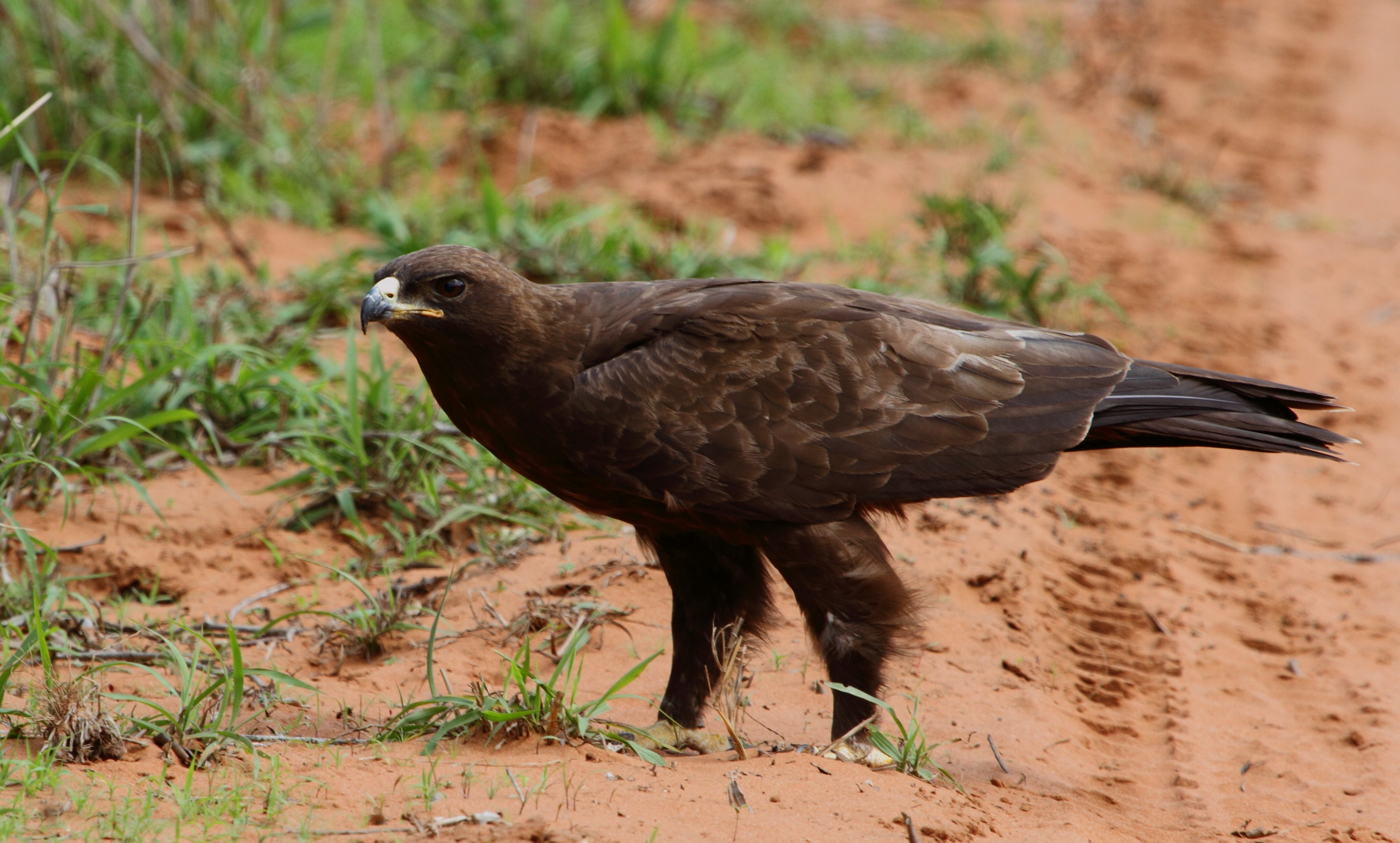
- H. wahlbergi

Scientific classification
- Kingdom: Animalia
- Phylum: Chordata
- Class: Aves
- Order: Accipitriformes
- Family: Accipitridae
- Subfamily: Aquilinae
- Genus: Hieraaetus; Kaup, 1844

Type species
- Falco pennatus Gmelin, JF, 1788

Species
- See text

= Hieraaetus =

Genus of birds

The genus Hieraaetus, sometimes known as small eagles or hawk-eagles, denotes a group of smallish eagles usually placed in the accipitrid subfamilies Buteoninae or Aquilinae.

They are generally medium-sized birds of prey inhabiting Europe, Asia, Africa, New Guinea and Australia. However, a recently extinct species, the New Zealand Haast's eagle, was the largest eagle ever known, weighing up to 17 kg (37 lb), with a 3 m (9.8 ft) wingspan.

== Taxonomy and species ==
The genus Hieraaetus was introduced in 1844 by the German naturalist Johann Jakob Kaup with the booted eagle as the type species. The name combines the Ancient Greek hierax meaning "hawk" with aetos meaning "eagle".

Molecular genetic research has found Hieraaetus to be polyphyletic with Aquila. (Note: Lerner & Mindell (2005) found three clades containing a mixture of Aquila and Hieraaetus: A. chrysaetos, Spizaetus africanus, H. fasciatus, A. verrauxii, A. audax, A. gurneyi; A. nipalensis, A. rapax, A. heliaca.; A. wahlbergi, H. ayersii, H. morphnoides (H. m. morphnoides), H. weiskei (H. m. weiskei), H. pennatus.) (Note: Helbig et al. (2004) concluded that "Hieraaetus fasciatus/spilogaster are closest to Aquila verreauxii and should be merged with that genus. Wahlberg’s eagle H. wahlbergi, formerly placed in Aquila, is part of a clade including three small Hieraaetus species (pennatus, ayresii, and morphnoides).") (Note: Wink & Sauer-Gürth (2004), comparing sequences of the mitochondrial cytochrome b gene, also found several clades within the booted eagles that did not correspond to the existing genera: A. adalberti, A. heliaca, A. rapax, A. nipalensis; A. audax, H. spilogaster, H. fasciatus, A. verrauxii, A. chrysaetos, A. ch. daphanea; A. wahlbergi, H. pennatus, H. morphnoides; A. clanga, A. pomarina, Lophoaetus occipitalis; But they commented: "Because Hieraaetus has been classified as a member of the genus Aquila before, the molecular data would support merging Hieraaetus with Aquila.)

Hieraaetus kienerii was found to be most distinct, and has been assigned to a separate genus, Lophotriorchis.

After DNA sequences from remains of the extinct giant Haast's eagle were found to be similar to those of the little eagle, it has been reclassified from Harpagornis moorei to the genus Hieraeetus.

The British Ornithological Union moved Bonelli's and booted eagles to Aquila in 2005, but was silent on the position of the non-European Ayres', little, and pygmy eagles.

This could create a taxonomic problem: the booted eagle is the type species of Hieraaetus, moving it would make that name a junior synonym of Aquila. Consequently, should any other hawk-eagles be retained as a distinct group, they would need to get a different genus name. As of 2014, the BOU lists the booted eagle on their Category D and E lists as H. pennatus, not A. pennata.

Christidis and Boles (2008) used an alternative approach. Accepting that both Aquila and Hieraaetus are polyphyletic, they moved spilogaster and fasciatus to the genus Aquila and retained the other former Hieraaetus group along with morphnoides and Aquila wahlbergi within the new delimitation of Hieraaetus.

Sometimes the entire genus was merged into Aquila. This was the approach taken with The Clements Checklist between 2001 and 2009: starting in the 2001 revisions to the 5th edition, and retained in the printed 6th edition of 2007.

The Clements Checklist, in its 2009 revisions, followed the same approach as Christidis & Boles, moving Aquila wahlbergi into Hieraaetus; restoring the booted, little and Ayres' eagles back to Hieraaetus.

The pygmy eagle, or New Guinea hawk-eagle, H. morphnoides weiskei was formerly considered a subspecies of the little eagle H. morphnoides; it has been recognized as a separate species by some authorities.

A more recent molecular study by Catanach et al. (2024), which included ultra-conserved genetic elements, supported the continued separation of Hieraaetus from Aquila, with H. wahlbergii in the former and A. spilogaster plus A. fasciata in the latter. It found H. wahlbergii diverged earliest, followed by Hieraaetus ayresii, then the remaining four species more tightly grouped.

The genus contains five species.

Image	Scientific name	Common name	Distribution
	Hieraaetus wahlbergi	Wahlberg's eagle	Africa
	Hieraaetus ayresii	Ayres's hawk-eagle	Africa
	Hieraaetus pennatus	Booted eagle	Eurasia and Africa
	Hieraaetus weiskei	Pygmy eagle	New Guinea
	Hieraaetus morphnoides	Little eagle	Australia

=== Extinct species ===
Image	Scientific name	Common name	Distribution
	†Hieraaetus moorei	Haast's eagle	New Zealand, extinct

=== Former species ===
Image	Scientific name	Common name	Distribution
	Aquila spilogaster (formerly H. fasciatus spilogaster or A. fasciatus spilogaster)	African hawk-eagle	Sub-Saharan Africa excluding rainforests
	Aquila fasciata (formerly H. fasciatus)	Bonelli's eagle	Mediterranean and southern Asia
	Lophotriorchis kienerii (formerly H. kienerii)	Rufous-bellied eagle	Asia

Some authorities retain Bonelli's eagle and the African hawk-eagle in Hieraaetus. Also, some retain Wahlberg's eagle in Aquila, whilst still recognizing Hieraaetus as a separate genus.
