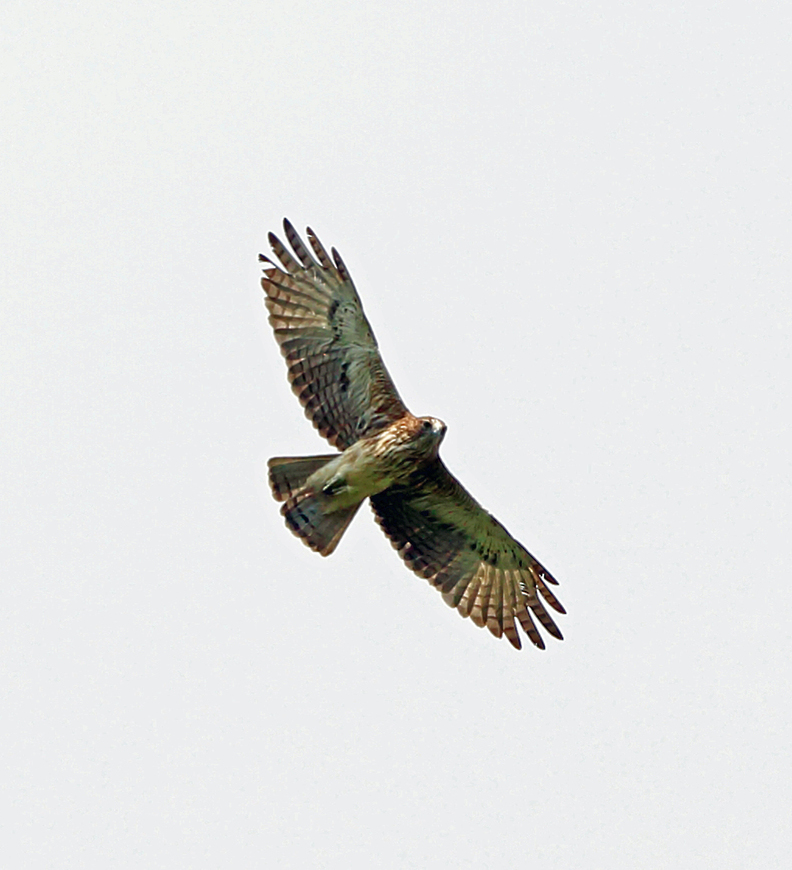

Conservation status
- Least Concern (IUCN 3.1)

Scientific classification
- Kingdom: Animalia
- Phylum: Chordata
- Class: Aves
- Order: Accipitriformes
- Family: Accipitridae
- Genus: Hieraaetus
- Species: H. weiskei

Binomial name
- Hieraaetus weiskei (Reichenow, 1900)
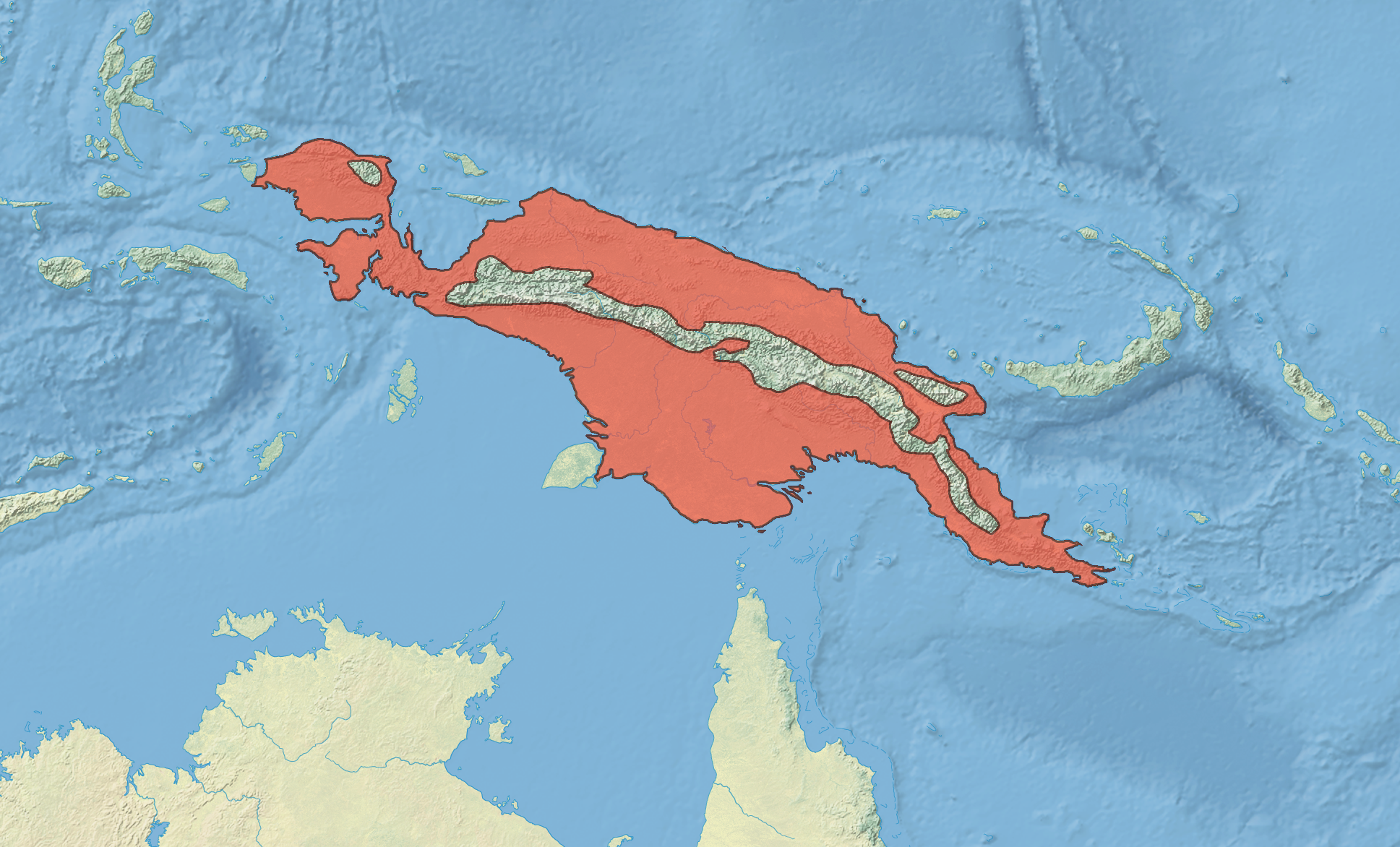

Synonyms
- Hieraaetus morphnoides weiskei

= Pygmy eagle =

Species of bird

The pygmy eagle or New Guinea hawk-eagle (Hieraaetus weiskei) is a bird of prey found in New Guinea. Its natural habitats are primarily subtropical or tropical moist lowland forest and subtropical or tropical moist montane forest. It is one of the smallest species of eagle.

== Taxonomy ==
The pygmy eagle was described by German naturalist Anton Reichenow as Eutolmaetus weiskei in 1900. It was subsequently considered a subspecies of the little eagle or a distinct species. Gjershaug and colleagues analysed it genetically and found it distinct enough to warrant species status. The International Ornithologists' Union (IOC) subsequently recognised it as a distinct species. "Pygmy eagle" has been designated the official name by the IOC.

== Description ==
=== Size ===
The pygmy eagle is one of the world's smallest-known species of eagle and smallest living member of the Aquilinae subfamily, only rivaled by the Great Nicobar serpent eagle in diminutive size by all modern species referred to as eagles. Pygmy eagles measure 38 to 48 cm (15 to 19 in) in length. The wingspan measures 112 to 126 cm (44 to 50 in). The female eagle is slightly larger than the male. One male pygmy eagle was found to weigh 483 g (1.065 lb). One study estimated the body mass of males of the species to fall around 406 g (0.895 lb) while that of females to fall around 555 g (1.224 lb).

=== Identification ===
The pygmy eagle shares many characteristics with its counterpart the little eagle. The most notable differences are color. The pygmy eagle has darker more pronounced streaks on the nape, crown and ventral. The bird also shares characteristics with the booted eagle, both eagles have a unique underwing pattern. The plumage of the pygmy eagle can vary depending on the morph, light or dark. The dark morph is very similar to the dark morph of the little eagle, while the light morph shows the most differences that occur in the dark streaking. The dark morph seems to be rarer as 10 out of 11 field sightings have been the light morph. The feet of the eagle are described as grey or dull yellow.

=== Voice ===
The voice of the pygmy eagle has been described as a "sip sip yeeee" during flights. The call can also be compared to the little eagle and booted eagle. The bird has also been observed giving a weaker single tone squeal.

== Distribution and habitat ==
The pygmy eagle primarily resides in lowland forests and forest edges in New Guinea. They enjoy nesting in closed forestry but have also been seen in open habitat and forest edges. The bird seems to be sparsely distributed throughout the hilly forests of New Guinea; however much of the forests of New Guinea are inaccessible so the eagle may be more abundant than it seems. One of the densely forested parts of New Guinea is Vogelkop or Bird's Head Peninsula. The pygmy eagle has been observed nineteen times in the Vogelkop over three years. It has also been observed on the island Buru and in the northern Moluccas.

== Food ==
Pygmy eagles have been seen soaring and diving on prey in forest canopies. The raptor is capable of very swift dives and attacks other avians such as the brown cuckoo-dove and mountain fruit-dove. Usually, the raptor low soars over the canopy scanning for prey and then dives on other birds in the canopy.
