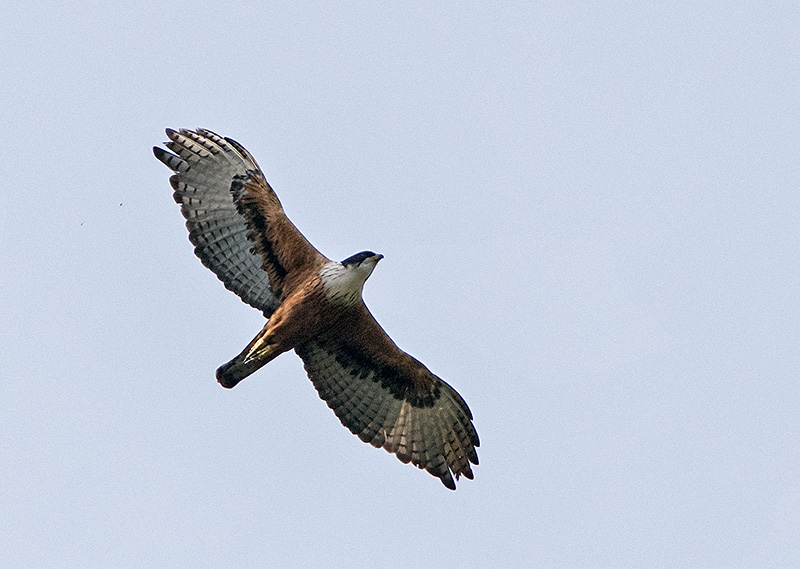

Conservation status
- Near Threatened (IUCN 3.1)

Scientific classification
- Kingdom: Animalia
- Phylum: Chordata
- Class: Aves
- Order: Accipitriformes
- Family: Accipitridae
- Genus: Lophotriorchis; Sharpe, 1874
- Species: L. kienerii

Binomial name
- Lophotriorchis kienerii (de Sparre, 1835)

Subspecies
- L. k. kienerii - (de Sparre, 1835); L. k. formosus - (Stresemann, 1924)

Synonyms
- Hieraaetus kienerii; Astur Kienerii protonym

= Rufous-bellied eagle =

Species of bird

The rufous-bellied eagle or rufous-bellied hawk-eagle (Lophotriorchis kienerii) is a bird of prey in the family Accipitridae that is found in the forested regions of tropical Asia. Relatively small for eagles and contrastingly patterned like a falcon, this species was earlier placed in the genus Hieraaetus and sometimes also in the genus Aquila but thought to be distinctive enough to belong to a separate genus.

== Taxonomy and systematics ==
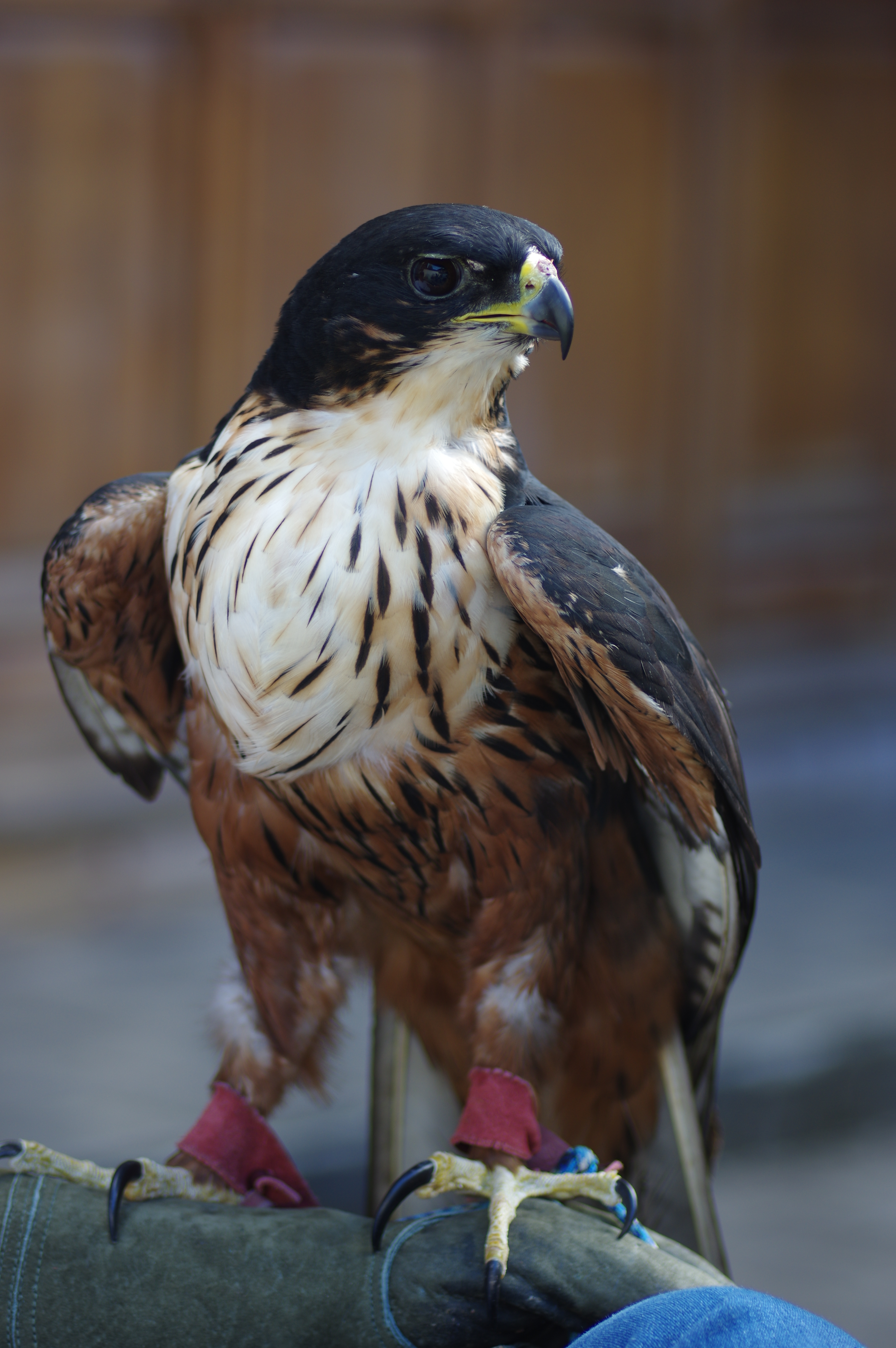
A captive adult rufous-bellied eagle.

This eagle was described as Astur Kienerii and illustrated as Falco Kienerii by "G. S." (Gustave de Sparre, though sometimes erroneously attributed to Geoffroy Saint-Hilaire) in 1834–1835. De Sparre's description was based on a specimen from the Himalayas in the collection of "M. le prince d'Essling".

It was later moved to Limnaetus by Jerdon, the genus Lophotriorchis and still later to Hieraaetus, the so-called "hawk-eagles". A study of the phylogeny of some Hieraaetus species and other eagles indicated that they were nested within the Aquila clade of eagles, resulting in their repositioning. Another molecular study of the eagles suggested that kienerii was distinctive enough to be retained in a separate genus for which the name Kienastur had been suggested but as this occurred in a thesis it is invalid for taxonomic purposes, and in any case Lophotriorchis was proposed much earlier (though originally shared with the Black-and-chestnut eagle which is nowadays placed in Spizaetus).

Within its wide range, two subspecies are recognized although there is no marked plumage difference. The nominate kienerii of India and Sri Lanka (the northern birds are larger); and formosus described by Erwin Stresemann in 1924 which is widely distributed across Southeast Asia from Burma to Sulawesi.

The species name was given by Count Louis Ernest Gustave de Sparre (1802-1866) and honours the French naturalist Louis Charles Kiener (1799-1881).

== Description ==
Adult rufous-bellied eagles are distinctive in their pattern. They have a black hood with a short crest. Chestnut underparts and wing coverts contrast with the white on the throat and breast. The sexes are almost indistinguishable in plumage but females are slightly larger and have more black on the face. They perch in a very upright stance and the wingtip almost reaches the tail. The tarsus is fully feathered. Juveniles have very white underparts with dark markings on the sides of the body, head mask and edge of underwing coverts. They can appear similar to a booted eagle (Aquila pennata). In flight, the underwing lining is dark and the greater coverts are black. The flight feathers are thinly barred with a black edge. The tail is dark and barred.

== Distribution and habitat ==
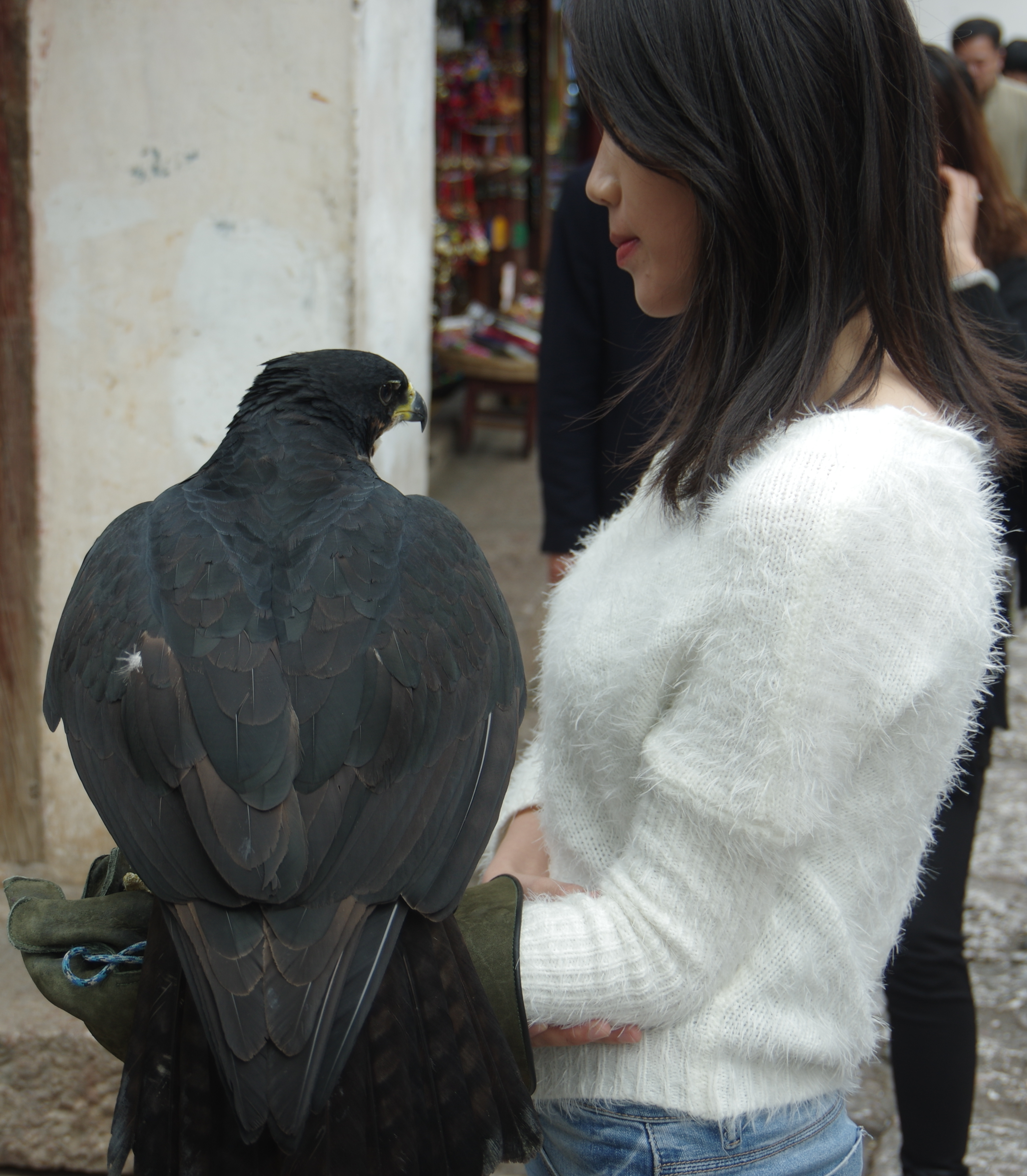

The rufous-bellied eagle is found in southern and south-eastern Asia and its range also extends to Sulawesi.

This species is associated mainly with hill forests. In India, they are commoner in the Western Ghats than along the Himalayas where they occur from Nepal to Assam. They also occur in parts of the Eastern Ghats.

== Behaviour and ecology ==
Measurements

Himalayas
| Length | ♂ | 490–505 mm (19.3–19.9 in) |
| | ♀ | 535–560 mm (21.1–22.0 in) |
| Tail | ♂ | 210–230 mm (8.3–9.1 in) |
| | ♀ | 236–250 mm (9.3–9.8 in) |
| Tarsus | ♂ | 150–160 mm (5.9–6.3 in) |
| | ♀ | 165–175 mm (6.5–6.9 in) |

Sri Lanka
| Length | ♂ | 450–475 mm (17.7–18.7 in) |
| | ♀ | 120–200 mm (4.7–7.9 in) |
| Tail | ♂ | 180–200 mm (7.1–7.9 in) |
| | ♀ | 100–200 mm (3.9–7.9 in) |
| Tarsus | ♂ | 150–200 mm (5.9–7.9 in) |

Rufous-bellied eagles are usually seen in flight, soaring high over the forest canopy. They dive to capture prey that can include birds and mammals in the air, canopy, or forest floor. Birds the size of the Sri Lanka wood pigeon, Kalij pheasant and junglefowl have been recorded as prey. The breeding season of the eagles is in winter with the young fledging in spring when the prey species are also breeding. The display flight involves stooping and wing-quivering. Their calls include a series of high pitched fwick, fwick... notes followed by a thin sweek!. They nest on a large, often bare tree, building a large platform of dry sticks and branches that they break off. The nest is lined with green leaves and a single egg is laid. Both parents take turns in incubation, feeding and nest defence.
