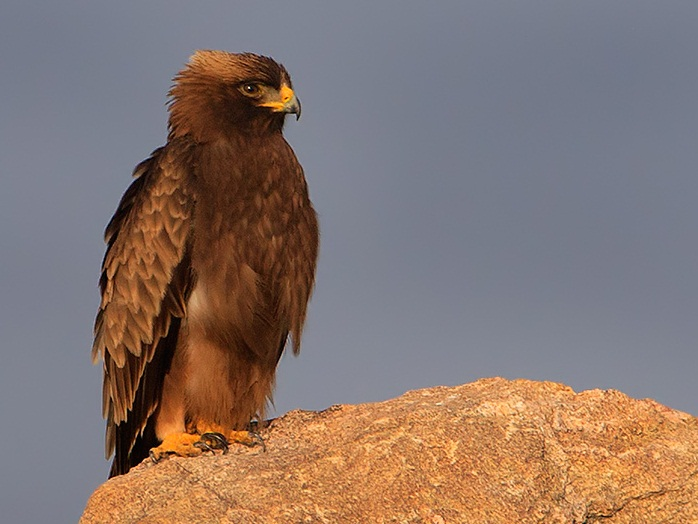
- A dark morph wintering in India

Conservation status
- Least Concern (IUCN 3.1)

Scientific classification
- Kingdom: Animalia
- Phylum: Chordata
- Class: Aves
- Order: Accipitriformes
- Family: Accipitridae
- Genus: Hieraaetus
- Species: H. pennatus

Binomial name
- Hieraaetus pennatus (Gmelin, 1788)
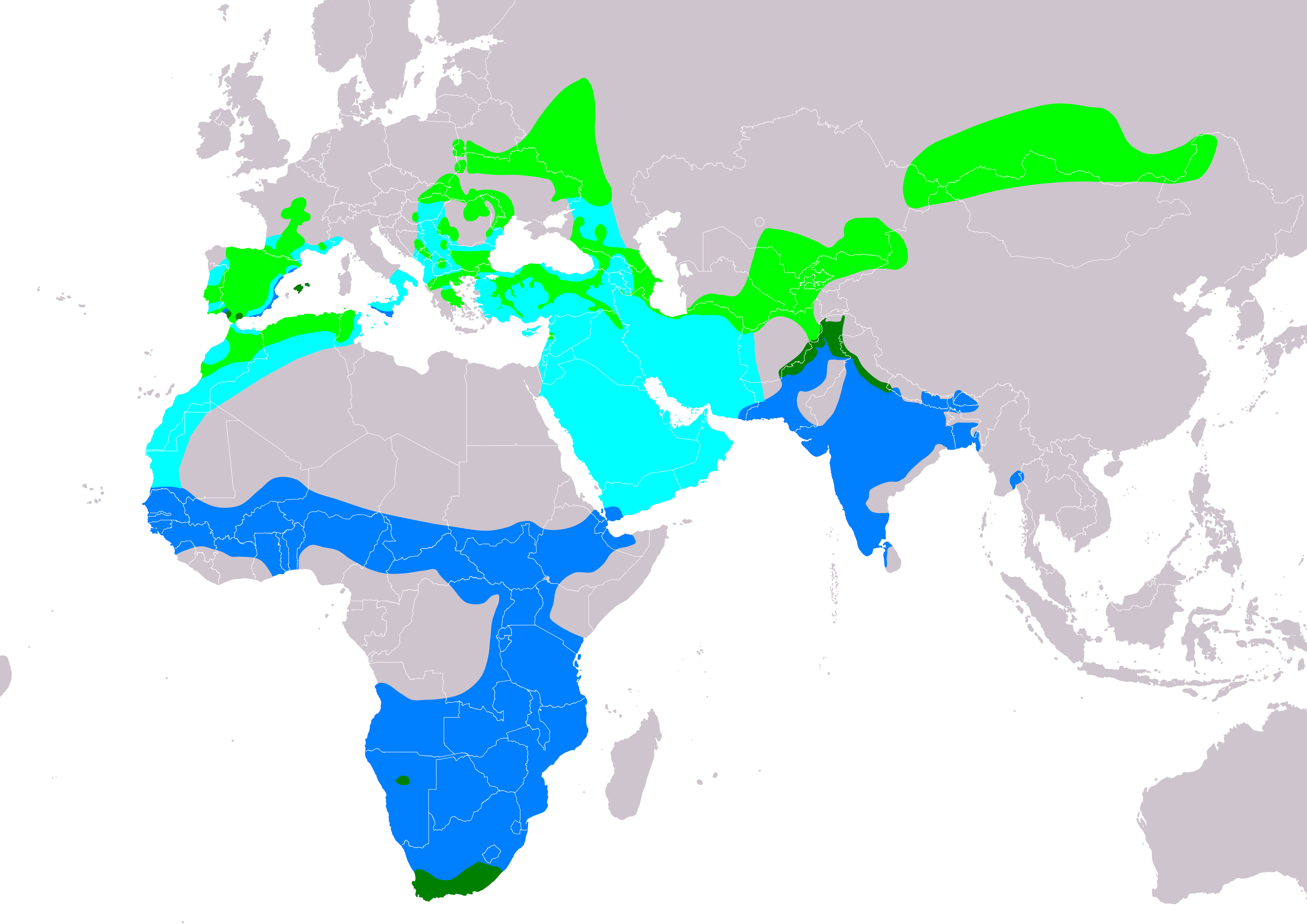
- Range of H. pennatus Breeding Resident Passage Non-breeding

Synonyms
- Aquila minuta Brehm, 1831; Aquila pennata Gmelin, 1788; Hieraaetus pennatus minisculus Yosef et al., 2000

Audio

= Booted eagle =

Species of bird

The booted eagle (Hieraaetus pennatus) is a medium-sized mostly migratory bird of prey with a wide distribution in the Palearctic and southern Asia, wintering in the tropics of Africa and Asia, with a small, disjunct breeding population in south-western Africa. Like all eagles, it belongs to the family Accipitridae.

== Taxonomy ==
The booted eagle was formally described in 1788 by the German naturalist Johann Friedrich Gmelin in his revised and expanded edition of Carl Linnaeus's Systema Naturae. He placed it with the eagle, falcons and relatives in the genus Falco and coined the binomial name Falco pennatus. Gmelin based his description on "Le Faucon Patu" or "Falco pedibus pennatis" that had been described and illustrated in 1760 by the French zoologist Mathurin Jacques Brisson. Brisson had examined a specimen in the collection of Madame de Bandeville who was also known as Marie Anne Catherine Bigot de Graveron (1709-1787). The booted eagle is now placed in the genus Hieraaetus that was introduced in 1844 by the German naturalist Johann Jakob Kaup. The genus name combines the Ancient Greek hierax meaning "hawk" with aetos meaning "eagle". The specific epithet pennatus is Latin and means "feathered". The booted eagle has no recognised subspecies.

Based on recent genetic research some authors reclassified this species to the genus Aquila, along with some or all other Hieraaetus species. As it is the type species of Hieraaetus, should any of the hawk-eagles have been retained in a distinct genus then a new name for that group would have been necessary. However, DNA research has shown it forms a monophyletic clade with Ayres's hawk eagle, Wahlberg's eagle, the little eagle and the pygmy eagle and this clade is often treated as forming the genus Hieraeetus and most reference lists currently use H. pennata.

Although some authors name a number of subspecies most now treat it as a monotypic species.

Aquila minut described by Brehm (1831) is this bird. The fossil bird described under the same name by Milne-Edwards (1871) is preliminarily known as Hieraaetus edwardsi, but might belong in Aquila.

== Description ==
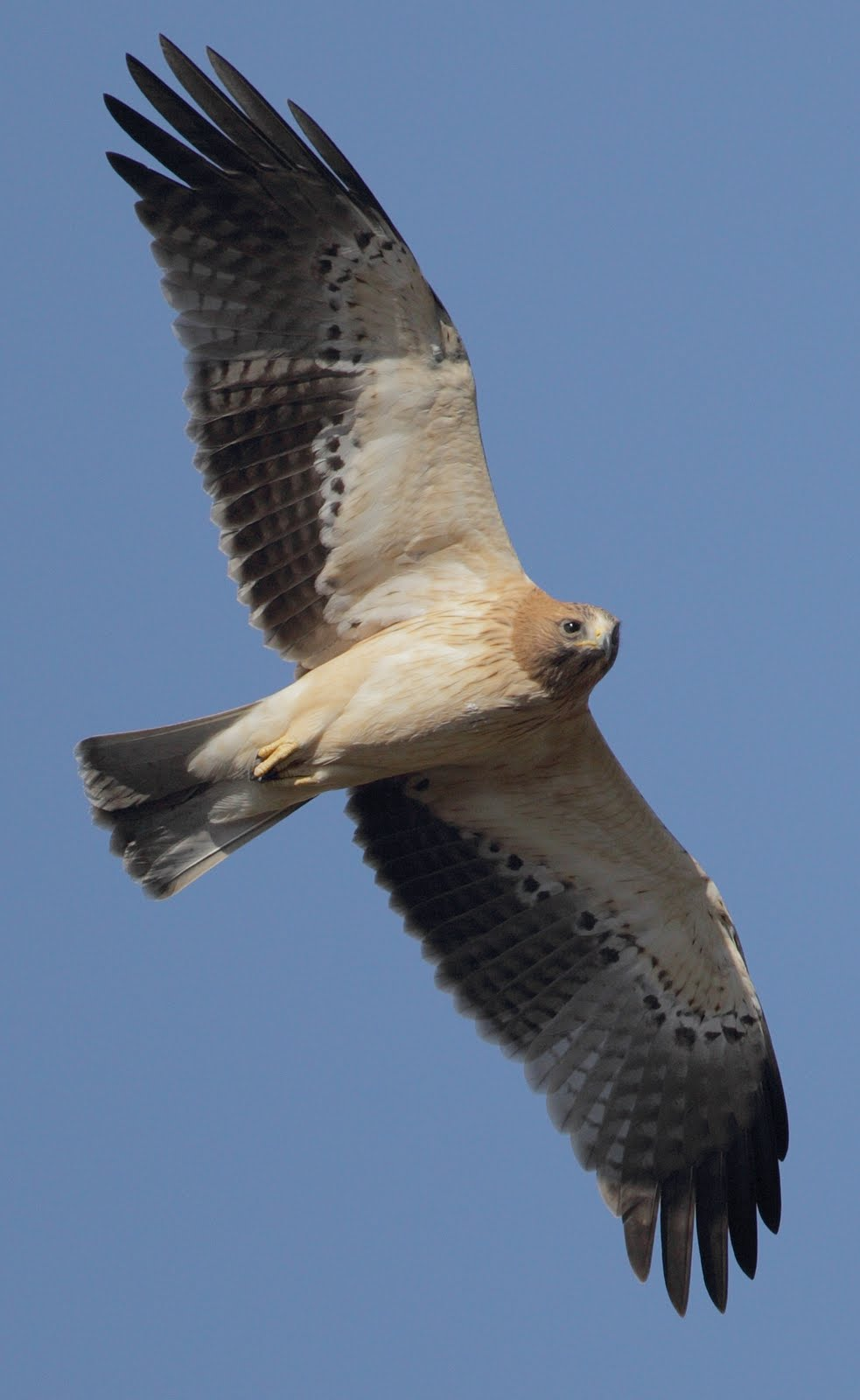
Light morph from below

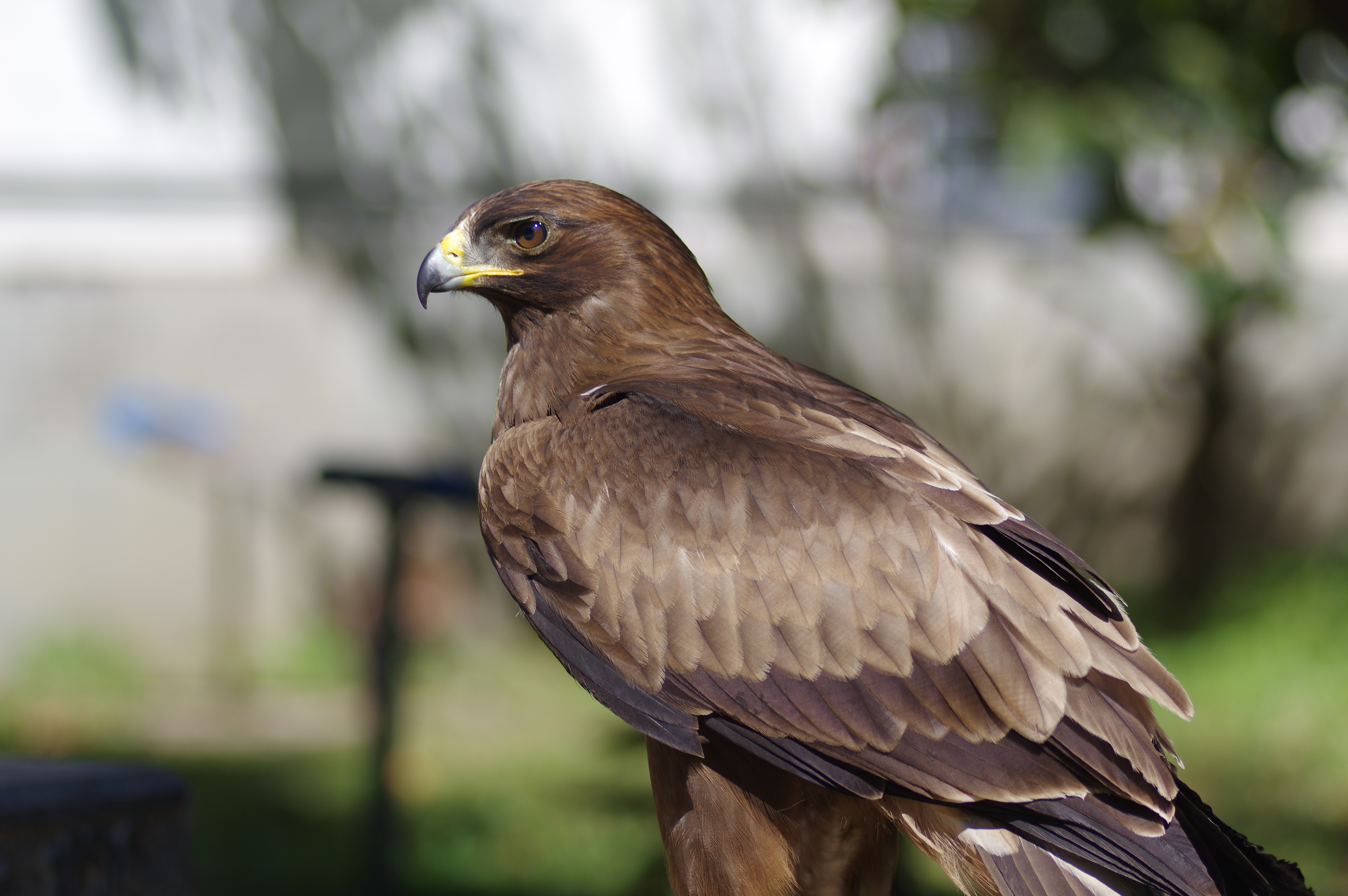

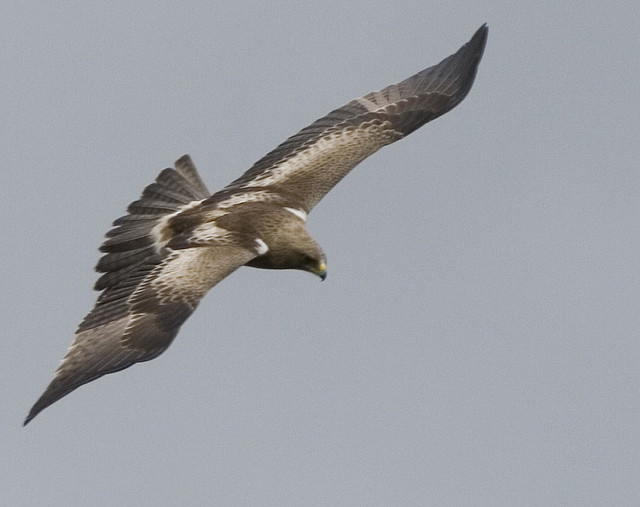
Showing the white marking on the wings termed as "landing lights"

The booted eagle is a small eagle with a length of 40 cm (16 in) and a wingspan of 110–132 cm (43–52 in); males weigh about 510–770 g (18–27 oz) and females about 840–1,025 g (29.6–36.2 oz). There are two relatively distinct plumage forms; pale individuals are mainly light grey with a darker head and flight feathers. The other form has mid-brown plumage with dark grey flight feathers. These discrete colour morphs follow a Mendelian inheritance pattern, where the paler allele is dominant. The dark colour morph represents 20% of the population in South Africa, but it is much more common in eastern populations such as in Russia. Booted eagles are typically seen in pairs or as solitary individuals. The call is a shrill kli-kli-kli.

== Distribution and habitat ==
The booted eagle has breeding populations in many different regions in both the northern and southern hemisphere. These include southern Europe, North Africa and across Asia, and also in western South Africa and Namibia. The northern populations are migratory spending November to February in Sub-Saharan Africa and South Asia, while the small southern African populations is sedentary. This is a species of wooded, often hilly countryside with some open areas. It breeds in rocky, broken terrain but migrants will use almost any type of habitat other than dense forest. The birds of the Palearctic breeding population tend to nest in coniferous or deciduous woodlands and often in trees.

=== Southern African populations ===
It is believed that there may be three separate groups of booted eagles in Southern Africa. There is evidence of a population which breeds in the south-western Cape region of South Africa, arriving in early August, laying eggs in September, and leaving in March of the following year. From about April to July the birds migrate northwards, some possibly overwintering in Namibia. A small breeding population in Northern Namibia has also been observed. The third group is a non-breeding population thought to migrate south from Eurasia and North Africa in summer, however no empirical evidence of this has been documented. These booted eagle populations are not sub-specifically distinct from those in Palearctic regions.

In South Africa, booted eagles also occur in hilly and open landscapes and in contrast to their Northern Hemisphere conspecifics, typically breed strictly on rocky cliffs in ravines and gorges. However, evidence has been found in South Africa of birds nesting in trees such as Euphorbias. This bird is most common in the low stature shrublands of the Fynbos and Karoo, and more specifically the ecotone between the two biomes.

== Behaviour and ecology ==
The booted eagle typically flies at relatively low heights, making it conspicuous. However, the dark morph can be confused with other local medium sized birds of prey. In South Africa, 20% of the population is the dark colour morph.

=== Diet and hunting ===
The booted eagle typically hunts on the wing, stooping quickly with wings folded in and feet extended. It hunts small mammals, reptiles and birds. In Southern Africa, it has been noted that birds are the most common prey. It has been suggested that frogs comprise an important part of the booted eagle diet, however this has not been observed in the Southern African populations. Studies conducted in south-western South Africa observed that they ate birds, lizards, and rodents.

=== Breeding ===
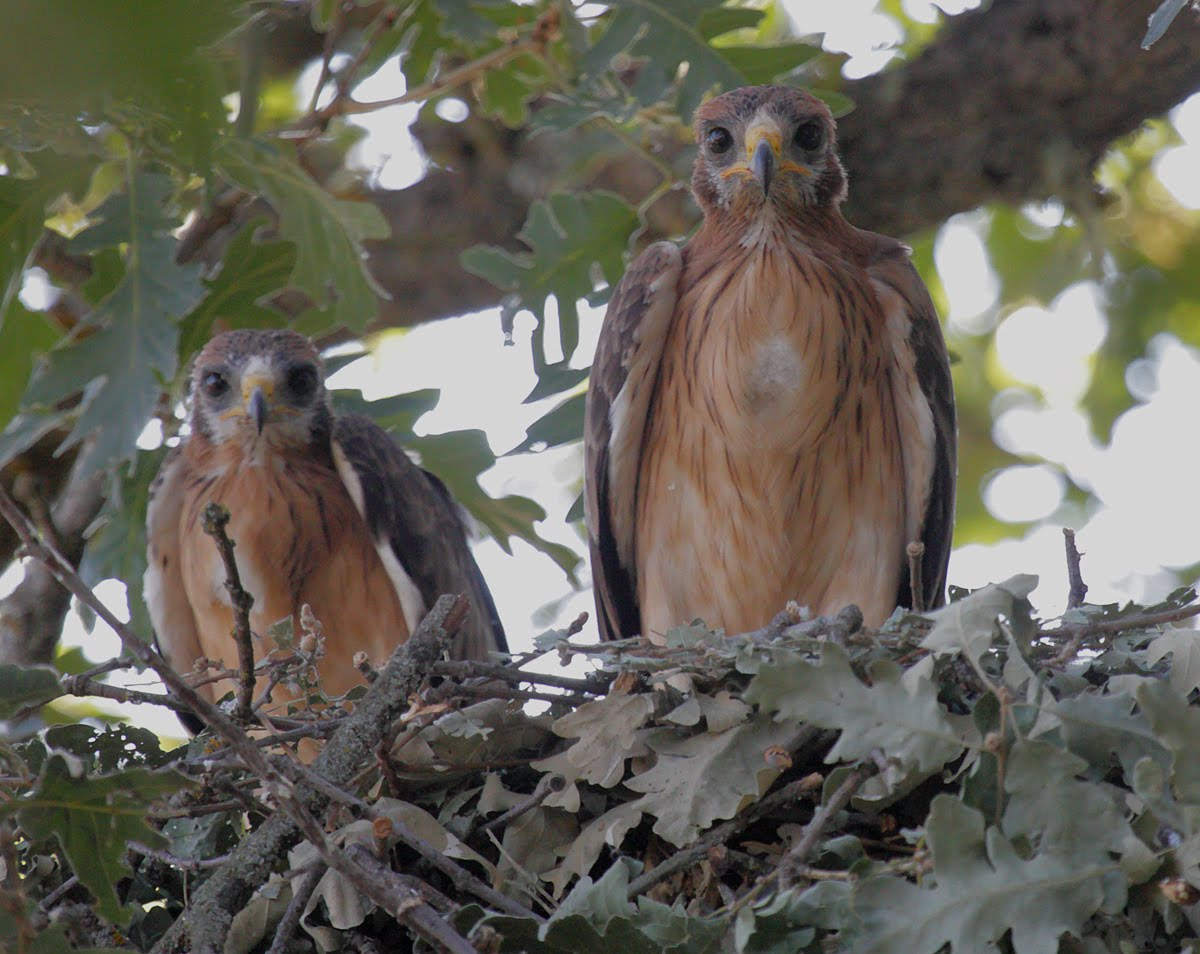
Booted eagle nest

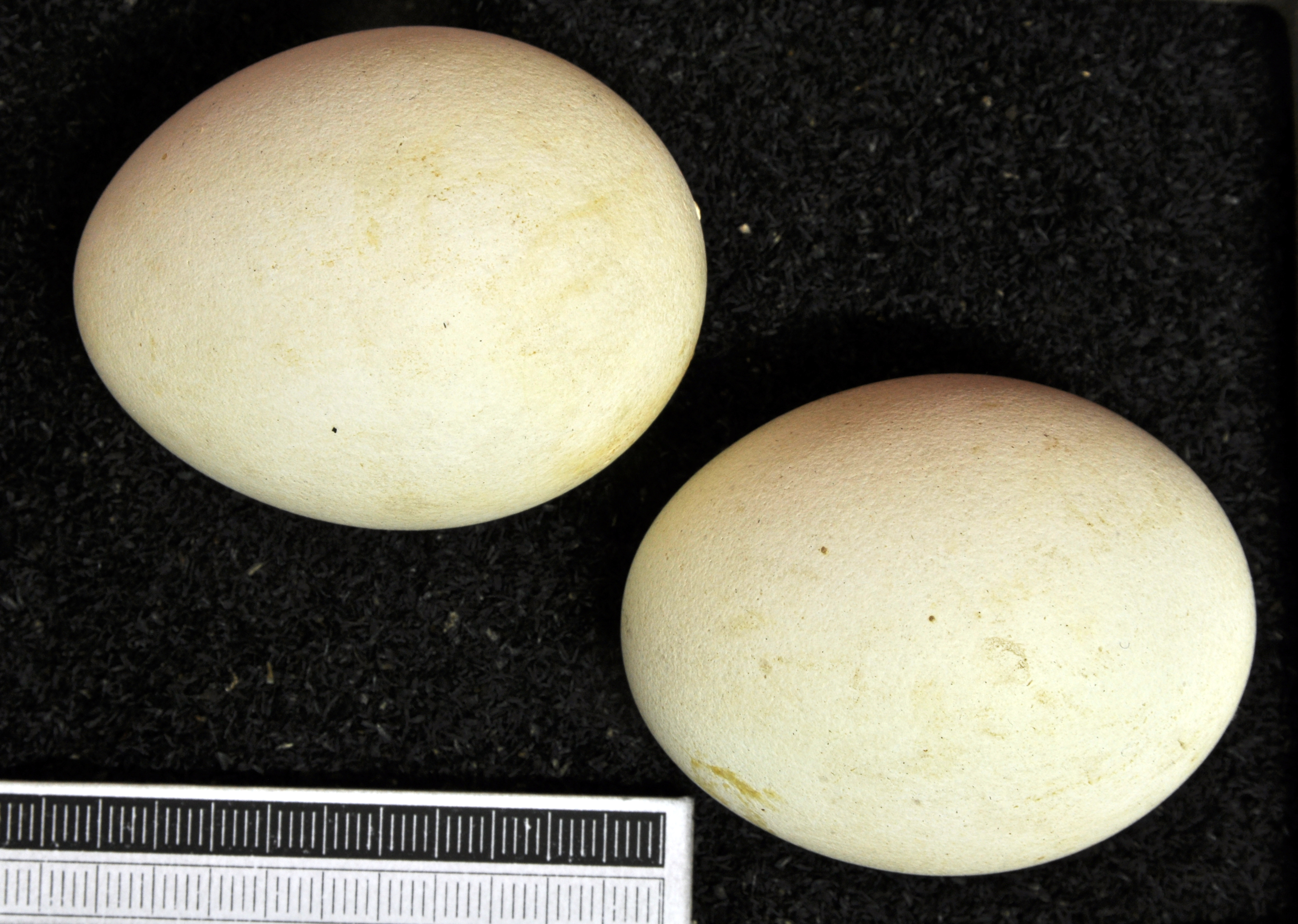
Eggs, in the collection of Museum Wiesbaden

This eagle lays 1–2 eggs in a nest built from sticks and lined with green leaves in a tree or on a crag, or it takes over the disused nest of another large bird such as a black kite or grey heron. The female incubates the egg for around 45 days and is fed by the male, after hatching she guards the nest and the young while the male provides all the food. The chick fledges after 70–75 days. Booted eagles are monogamous and perform courtship rituals of sophisticated flight demonstrations.

==== Southern Africa ====
The population of eagles which breed in the Cape region of South Africa typically do so shortly after arriving in August. The breeding pairs nest on cliff ledges, this is one of the ways in which this population differs to the Palearctic booted eagles. It has been observed that the incubation period for this population is about 40 days, and the nestling period around two months. It was found in a study conducted in South Africa that typical to the species, booted eagles nested on cliffs at an average height of 60m. The clutch size was also comparable with Palearctic populations, with pairs generally successfully raising two chicks according to existing evidence. The eggs are typically a conspicuous white colour sometimes with red speckles. The dimensions of the eggs are consistent with those of Palearctic populations. The nests of the booted eagles in Southern Africa also appear to be less rigid than those of their Palearctic counterparts.

==== Northern African ====
Populations of booted eagles migrate to parts of North Africa during European winter and breed there. A study conducted in Algeria determined that these birds typically incubate their eggs for a period of 33 to 38 days. Similarly to populations further North and South, it was most likely for clutches to consist of two eggs (67.6%).

== Conservation and threats ==
There is a great lack of research about this migratory species. The Southern African populations were relatively recently discovered in the 1980s, possibly suggesting that they migrated due to changing climate and environmental conditions. Changes in human land use may have driven the changes in migration patterns of these birds. It is also thought that this species has been overlooked in Southern Africa due to the remote and discrete nature of their nesting sites.
