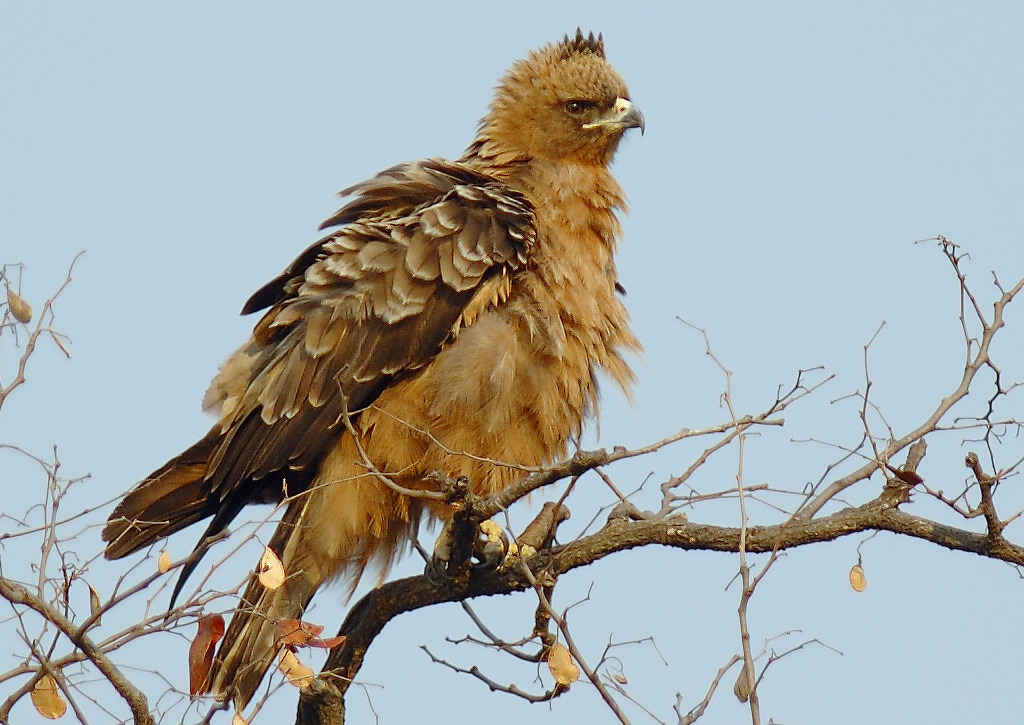
- Photographed in the Kruger National Park, South Africa

Conservation status
- Least Concern (IUCN 3.1)

Scientific classification
- Kingdom: Animalia
- Phylum: Chordata
- Class: Aves
- Order: Accipitriformes
- Family: Accipitridae
- Genus: Hieraaetus
- Species: H. wahlbergi

Binomial name
- Hieraaetus wahlbergi (Sundevall, 1850)

Synonyms
- Aquila wahlbergi Sundevall, 1850; Micraetus wahlbergi Roberts, 1922

= Wahlberg's eagle =

Species of bird

Wahlberg's eagle (Hieraaetus wahlbergi) is a bird of prey that is native to sub-Saharan Africa, where it is a seasonal migrant in the woodlands and savannas. It is named after the Swedish naturalist Johan August Wahlberg. Like all eagles, it belongs to the family Accipitridae.

== Description ==
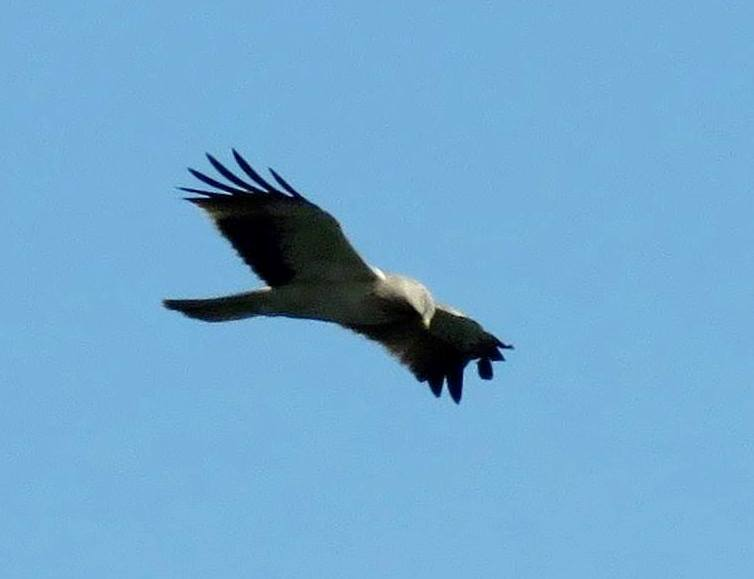
It is cross-shaped in flight with straight-edged wings and a square tail.

Wahlberg's eagle is a medium-sized raptor, and the sexes are similar. It is about 53–61 cm (21–24 in) in length with a wingspan of 130–146 cm (51–57 in) and a body mass of 437–845 g (15.4–29.8 oz) for males and 670–1,400 g (24–49 oz) for females on average. The head has a small crest, and the legs are yellow. The plumage tone is variable but may be dark brown except for dark-streaked grey undersides to the flight feathers, and a barred grey undertail. Light and dark plumage phases occur. A pale variant may be much lighter brown with whitish, rather than grey undertail and flight feather undersides. The pale variant is much less common than the darker variant.

== Distribution and habitat ==
Wahlberg's eagle is distributed from central Chad to the north-east coast of South Africa. Its western boundary is thought to be Cameroon, although it most commonly occurs further east across the continent. Within this large range, it usually remains between sea-level and 1,800 m (5,900 ft), but has also been documented at an altitude of 2,800 m (9,200 ft) in Ethiopia.

Wahlberg's eagles cover large distances in short periods. In 1994, a female Wahlberg's eagle was tracked over a period of 9 months, during which it covered over 8,800 km (5,500 mi) from northern Namibia to Chad and back; its range between breeding in the south and non-breeding areas in the north was 3,520 km (2,190 mi), and it travelled over 700 km (430 mi) due north in just five days after leaving its breeding grounds.

== Behaviour and ecology ==
Wahlberg's eagle mainly hunts birds (including other raptors such as the Gabar goshawk and Barn owl), although it also feeds on reptiles (various lizards and snakes) and a few small mammals (Tree squirrels, Mongooses, Hares). It has also been recorded eating various Invertebrates such as termites, grasshoppers and beetles.

Wahlberg's eagle breeds mainly in southern Africa during the October to February period. It builds a stick nest in the fork of a tree or the crown of a palm tree. Wahlberg's eagles are monogamous and form long-term pair bonds. They are well known for complex and spectacular aerial courtship displays. They are very territorial and solitary nesters. The nest is often reused by the same pair through multiple years. Their breeding season occurs during the wet season of northern South Africa from October to February as food is more readily available. The female feeds the chicks with food provided by the male eagle. Reductions in reproductive output were observed in the 1990s, which were thought to be related to increased population density in Wahlberg's eagles; breeding success was highly density dependant, and resource availability did not play a part in this phenomenon.

== Taxonomy ==
Studies of marker gene sequences found Wahlberg's eagle belongs to a clade containing Hieraaetus pennatus, H. morphnoides, H. ayeresii, and H. (m.) weiskei. Since then, many taxonomic checklists changed from Aquila wahlbergi to Hieraaetus wahlbergi. However, the African Bird Club as of 2012 and the Second Southern African Bird Atlas Project as of 2014 continued to keep Aquila wahlbergi separate from the Hieraaetus species.

A 2024 molecular study included ultra-conserved genetic elements; analysis results support the separation of Hieraaetus from Aquila, with H. wahlbergii in the former, A. spilogaster and A. fasciata in the latter, and H. wahlbergii basal to the four other Hieraaetus.
