= Trešnjica =

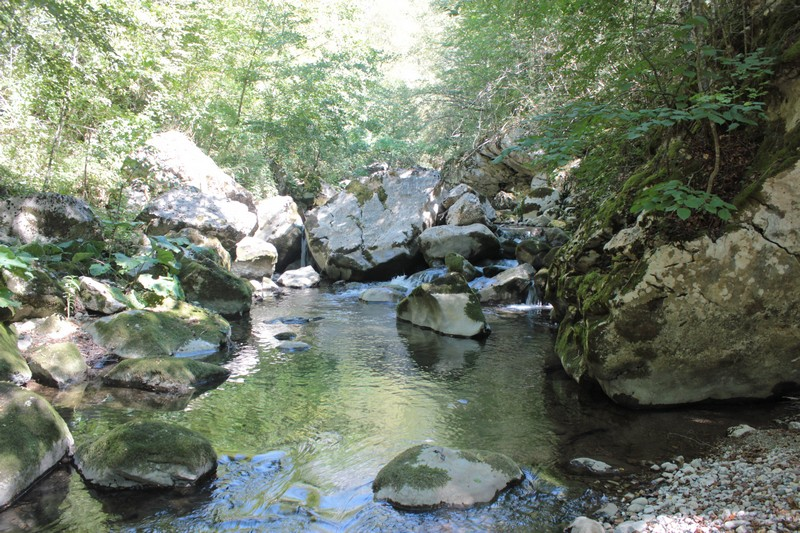
- Trešnjica gorge
- Etymology: Little cherry
- Native name: Трешњица (Serbian)

Location
- Country: Serbia
- Region: Podrinje
- District: Mačva District
- Municipality: Ljubovija

Physical characteristics
- Source
  - location: Povlen
  - elevation: 1,185 m (3,888 ft)
- Mouth: Drina
  - location: Gornja Trešnjica
  - coordinates: 44.1170°N 19.4909°E
  - elevation: 180 m (590 ft)
- Length: 23 km (14 mi)^{a}
- Discharge
  - location: the river mouth

Basin features
- Tributaries
  - left: Tribuća, Sušica
- Progression: Drina→ Sava→ Danube→ Black Sea

Trešnjica is a river in western Serbia. The source of the river is situated on the Povlen mountain. After 23 km the Trešnjica joins the Drina near Ljubovija.

== Course ==
The Trešnjica originates on the southwestern slope of the Povlen, at an altitude of 1,185 m (3,888 ft). The river's major tributaries are Tribuća (7 km (4.3 mi) long) and Sušica, both from the left. It empties into the Drina near the village of Gornja Trešnjica, at an altitude of 180 m (590 ft).

== Trešnjica Gorge ==
Several kilometers before the convergence with the Drina, the river has created a deep limestone gorgelike canyon with vertical cliffs. The canyon was cut into the 800 m (2,600 ft) to 1,000 m (3,300 ft) high plateau. Both major tributaries, Tribuća and Sušica, flow into the Trešnjica in the canyon, which is 6 km (3.7 mi) long. The gorge, deep up to 152 m (499 ft), is almost impenetrable but an attractive location for the climbers.

== Protection ==
=== Special nature reserve Gorge of the Trešnjica river ===
The area is a designated nature reserve of which the largest part is covered with forests and thickets of common hornbeam, turkey oak, black pine and juniper. The reserve, which covers an area of 595 km^{2} (230 sq mi), is established to protect the ethnic heritage, but was primarily founded to protect the habitat of the griffon vulture.

After an incident in August 2020 when several chicks drowned after a helicopter flew low over the Uvac reserve and scared the birds which jumped into the water, the conditional no-fly zone over the vulture's protected areas of Trešnjica, Uvac and Mileševka.

=== Wildlife ===
Many birds of prey nest in the Trešnjica gorge, including golden eagle, common kestrel, goshawk and sparrow hawk. Trešnjica is the location of the northernmost habitat of griffon vulture and only second region in Serbia inhabited by the bird, after the Uvac canyon. Population stabilized at some 17 nesting couples, after number fell from 41 to 32 vultures in 2008/09. It is believed that the reason for the dwindling population was illegal poisoning of the vermin, which in turn poisoned their predators like stray dogs and wolves in the surrounding regions. Several locals were sentenced for the poisoning.

Specificity of the gorge is the spring migration of the huchen fish. They migrate from the Drina, upstream into the Trešnjica to spawn. A fish pond is built on the Trešnjica for the breeding of the rainbow trout. The fish pond is the only one in Serbia which uses the technique of pumping the liquid oxygen into the water which tripled the production.
