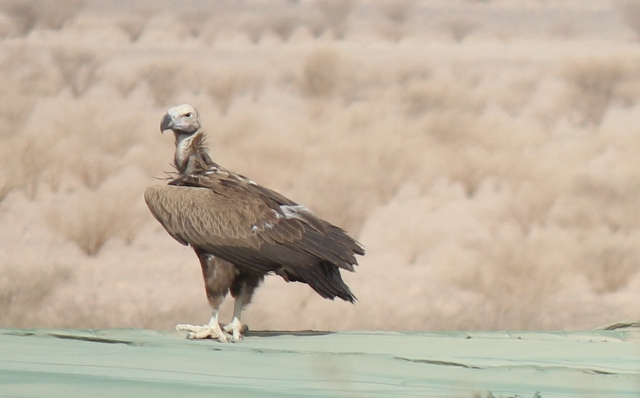
- Arabian giant vulture in Saudi Arabia

Scientific classification
- Kingdom: Animalia
- Phylum: Chordata
- Class: Aves
- Order: Accipitriformes
- Family: Accipitridae
- Genus: Torgos
- Species: T. tracheliotos
- Subspecies: T. t. negevensis

Trinomial name
- Torgos tracheliotos negevensis Bruun, Mendelssohn & Bull, 1981

= Torgos tracheliotos negevensis =

Subspecies of vulture

Torgos tracheliotos negevensis, the Arabian lappet-faced vulture or Arabian vulture, is an endangered bird endemic to the western and southern Arabian Peninsula. It is a giant subspecies of the more widespread lappet-faced vulture.

== Taxonomy ==
The bird is assigned the trinomial Torgos tracheliotos ssp. negevensis. Torgos is Ancient Greek for “vulture” and tracheliotos means “cartilage-eared". negevensis refers to the Negev desert, a desert in Israel where the vulture once lived.

Due to several differences from the African subspecies, it has been elevated to a full species by some authorities.

== Description ==
The Arabian vulture appears similar to its African counterpart, however several features distinguish the two. Its head has a faded, grey colour as opposed to the bright pink head of the African subspecies. Their plumage is dark brown, as opposed to its African counterpart's darker black feather. It is noticeably larger, with a mass of about 11 kilograms in some females, in comparison to a typical maximum of 9 kilograms in lappet-faced vultures in Africa. It is outsized only by the Cinereous vulture in its range.

== Distribution ==
This bird has a limited range, occupying small swathes of the Arabian Peninsula. It lives in Saudi Arabia, the UAE, Oman and Yemen, occasionally migrating to overwinter. It has been exterminated from the Negev and the Sinai Peninsula. A single vagrant was recorded in Kuwait in 2008.
