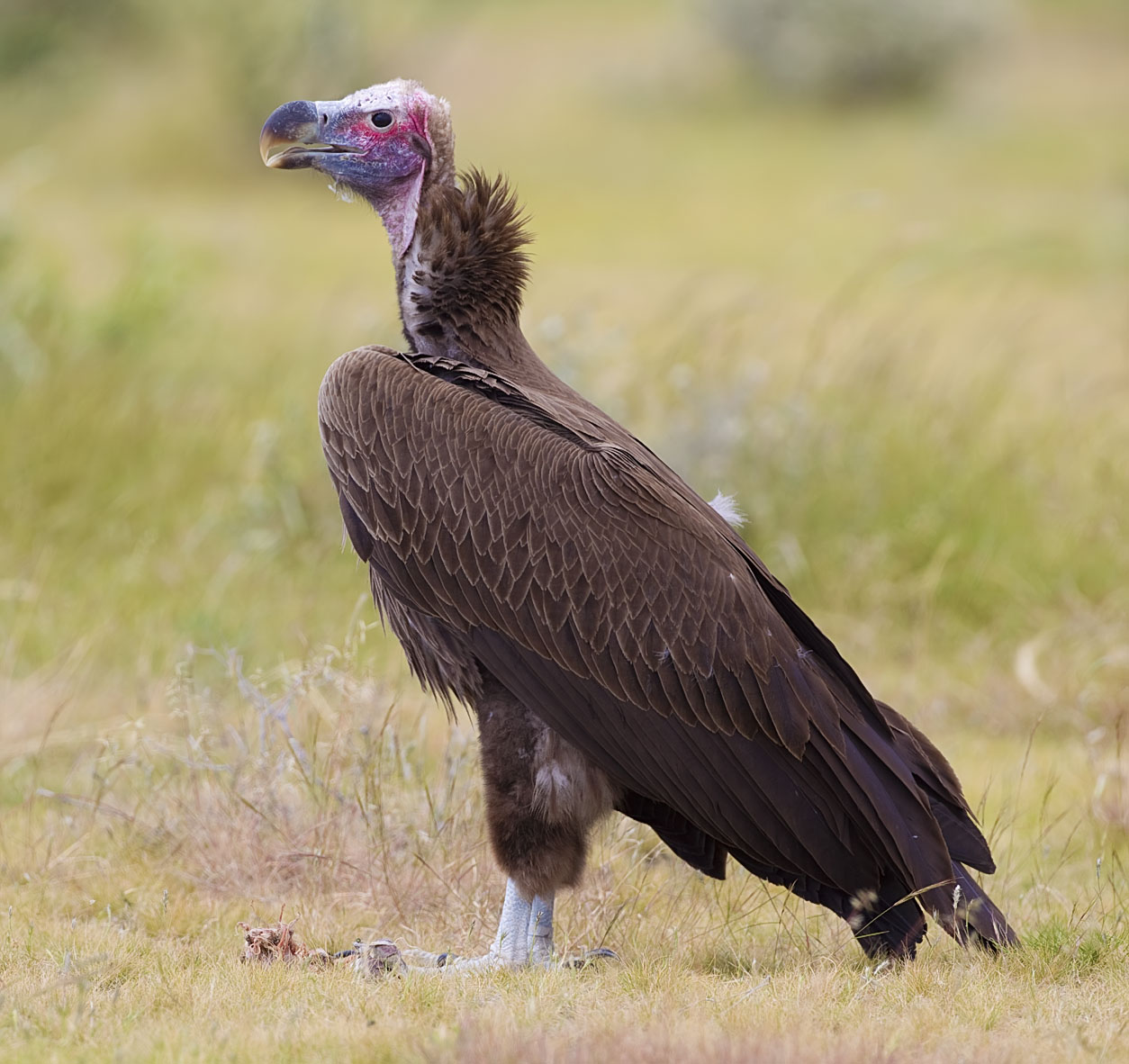
- At Etosha National Park, Namibia

Conservation status
- Endangered (IUCN 3.1)

Scientific classification
- Kingdom: Animalia
- Phylum: Chordata
- Class: Aves
- Order: Accipitriformes
- Family: Accipitridae
- Genus: Torgos
- Species: T. tracheliotos

Binomial name
- Torgos tracheliotos (Forster, 1796)

Subspecies
- T. t. tracheliotos - (Forster, JR, 1796); T. t. negevensis - Bruun, Mendelssohn & Bull, 1981
- Range of T. tracheliotos Resident Possibly Extant (resident) Non-breeding Extinct Probably extinct

Synonyms
- List: Torgos tracheliotus (lapsus); Vultur tracheliotos J. R. Forster, 1796; Vultur auricularis Daudin, 1800; Vultur aegypius Temminck, 1826; Vultur imperialis Temminck, 1827; Vultur nubicus H. Smith, 1829

= Lappet-faced vulture =

Species of bird

The lappet-faced vulture or Nubian vulture (Torgos tracheliotos) is an Old World vulture belonging to the bird order Accipitriformes, which also includes eagles, kites, buzzards and hawks. It is the only extant member of the genus Torgos. It is not closely related to the superficially similar New World vultures, and does not share the good sense of smell of some members of that family of birds.

The lappet-faced vulture was formerly considered monotypical, but now is separated into two subspecies. The nominate race lives throughout Africa. The subspecies T. t. negevensis, differing considerably in appearance from African vultures (as described below), is endemic to the Arabian Peninsula.

== Name ==
The scientific name is Greek, meaning "Cartilage-eared Vulture".

== Distribution ==
This species is patchily distributed through much of Africa and the Arabian Peninsula, though it is absent from much of the central and western parts of the continent and declining elsewhere in its range. The lappet-faced vulture breeds in Senegal, Mali, Mauritania, Burkina Faso, Niger, Chad, Sudan, Egypt, Ethiopia, Somalia, Kenya, Tanzania, Uganda, Rwanda, the Democratic Republic of the Congo, Zambia, Malawi, Mozambique, Eswatini, South Africa, Zimbabwe, Botswana and Namibia. On the Arabian Peninsula, it breeds in Yemen, Oman, the United Arab Emirates and Saudi Arabia. It is also present in Gambia, Guinea, Ivory Coast, Benin, the Central African Republic and Angola, as well as a single vagrant record in Kuwait.

== Habitat ==
This vulture prefers to live in dry savannah, thornbush, arid plains, deserts with scattered trees in wadis, open mountain slopes. They are usually found in undisturbed open country with a scattering of trees and apparently prefer areas with minimal grass cover. While foraging, they can wander into denser habitats and even into human inhabited areas, especially if drawn to road kills. They may be found in elevation from sea-level to 4,500 m (14,800 ft).

== Description ==
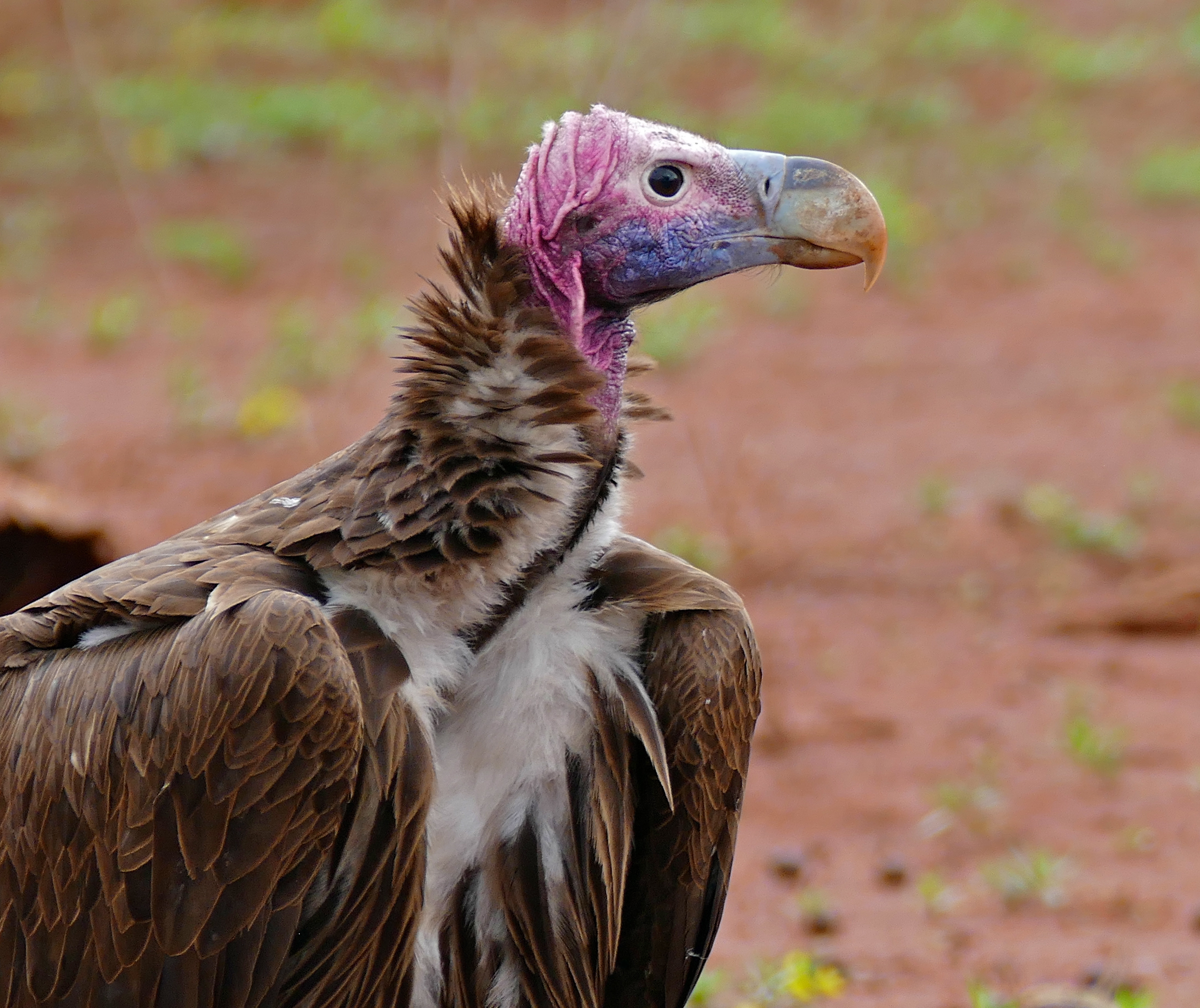
In Kruger National Park, South Africa

The lappet-faced vulture is a very large species, ranking as the longest and largest winged vulture in its range, behind the closely related cinereous vulture, although some co-occurring Gyps vultures tend to be heavier on average, especially the Cape vulture and Eurasian griffon. This species measures around 95–115 cm (37–45 in) in body length, with a wingspan of 2.5–2.9 m (8.2–9.5 ft). Among the standard measurements, the wing chord is 71.5–82.5 cm (28.1–32.5 in), the tail is 33–36 cm (13–14 in) and the tarsus is 12.2–15 cm (4.8–5.9 in). The bill, at up to 10 cm (3.9 in) long and 5 cm (2.0 in) deep, ranks as one of the largest of any accipitrid, although a reported culmen length of 7.2 cm (2.8 in) is slightly less than the culmen length of the cinereous vulture. Wild vultures of the subspecies T. t. tracheliotus range from 4.4 to 9.4 kg (9.7 to 20.7 lb) and in East Africa, average only 6.2 kg (14 lb). On the other hand, captive vultures of the larger T. t. negevensis subspecies weighed 6.5–9.2 kg (14–20 lb) in males and 10.5–13.6 kg (23–30 lb) in females.

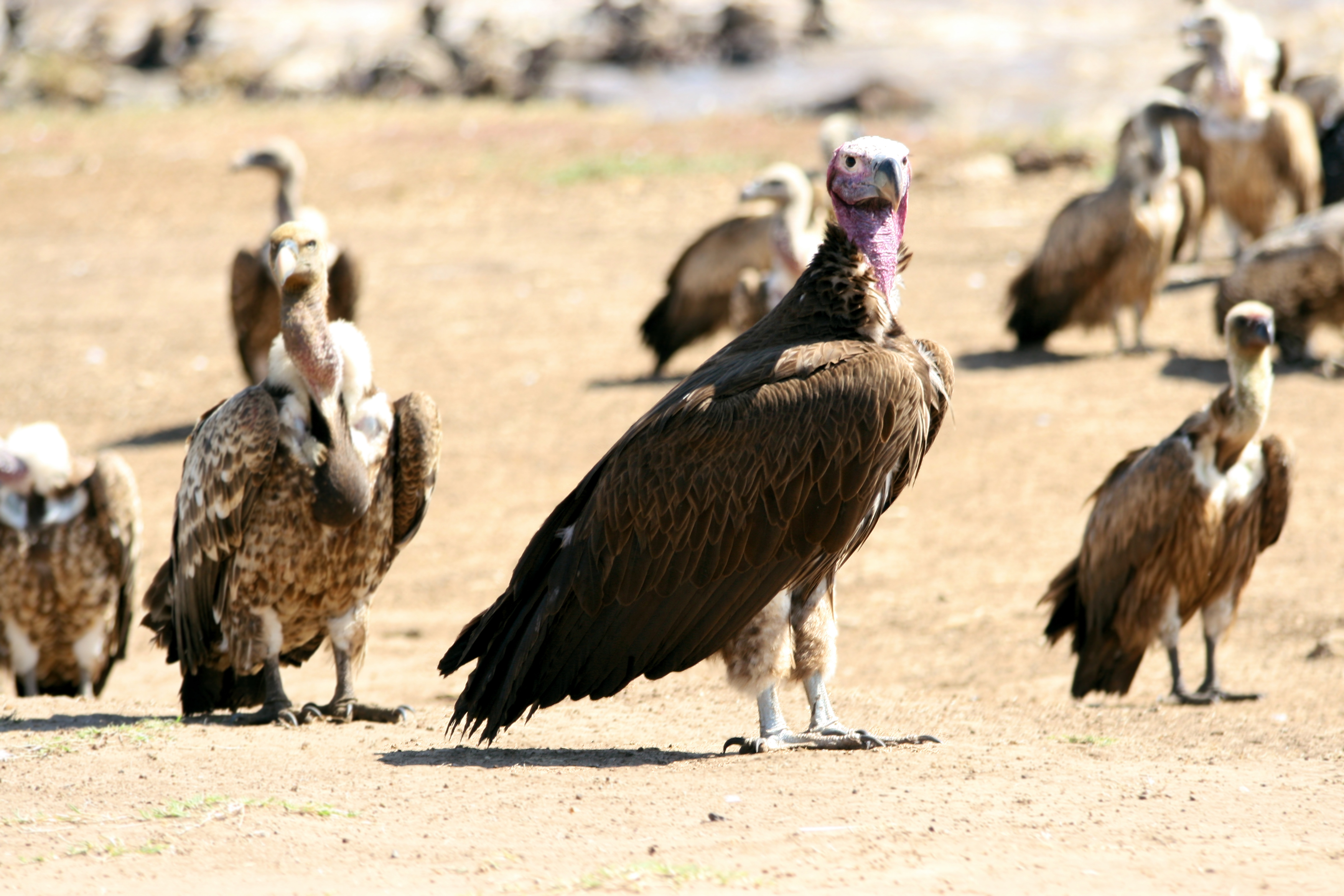
A lappet-faced vulture amongst white-backed vultures and Ruepell's griffons, illustrating its size

Overall, the lappet-faced vulture is blackish above with a strongly contrasting white thigh feathers. The black feathers on the back of African vultures are lined with brown, while Arabian birds are dark brown rather than black above. The underside can range from pure white to buff-brown. Like many vultures, it has a bald head. The head coloration can range from reddish in southern Africa to dull pink in more northern Africa to pink on the back of the head and gray on the front in the Arabian Peninsula. The combination of the colorful head and fleshy folds on the side of it are distinctive. The bald head of the lappet-faced vulture is advantageous, because a feathered head would become spattered with blood and other fluids when feeding, and thus be difficult to keep clean. While flying, lappet-faced vultures have large, broad wings held with the front edges held parallel and slightly pointed, serrated-looking wingtips. Compared to the somewhat similarly marked hooded vulture, it is considerably larger with a more massive bill and can only be confused at a great distance. The Gyps vultures are generally much paler, with less white lining the wings and more bulging secondaries. The cinereous vulture (which may overlap in range in the Arabian area) has a similar body shape but is all dark, with no contrasting plumage.

== Behaviour ==
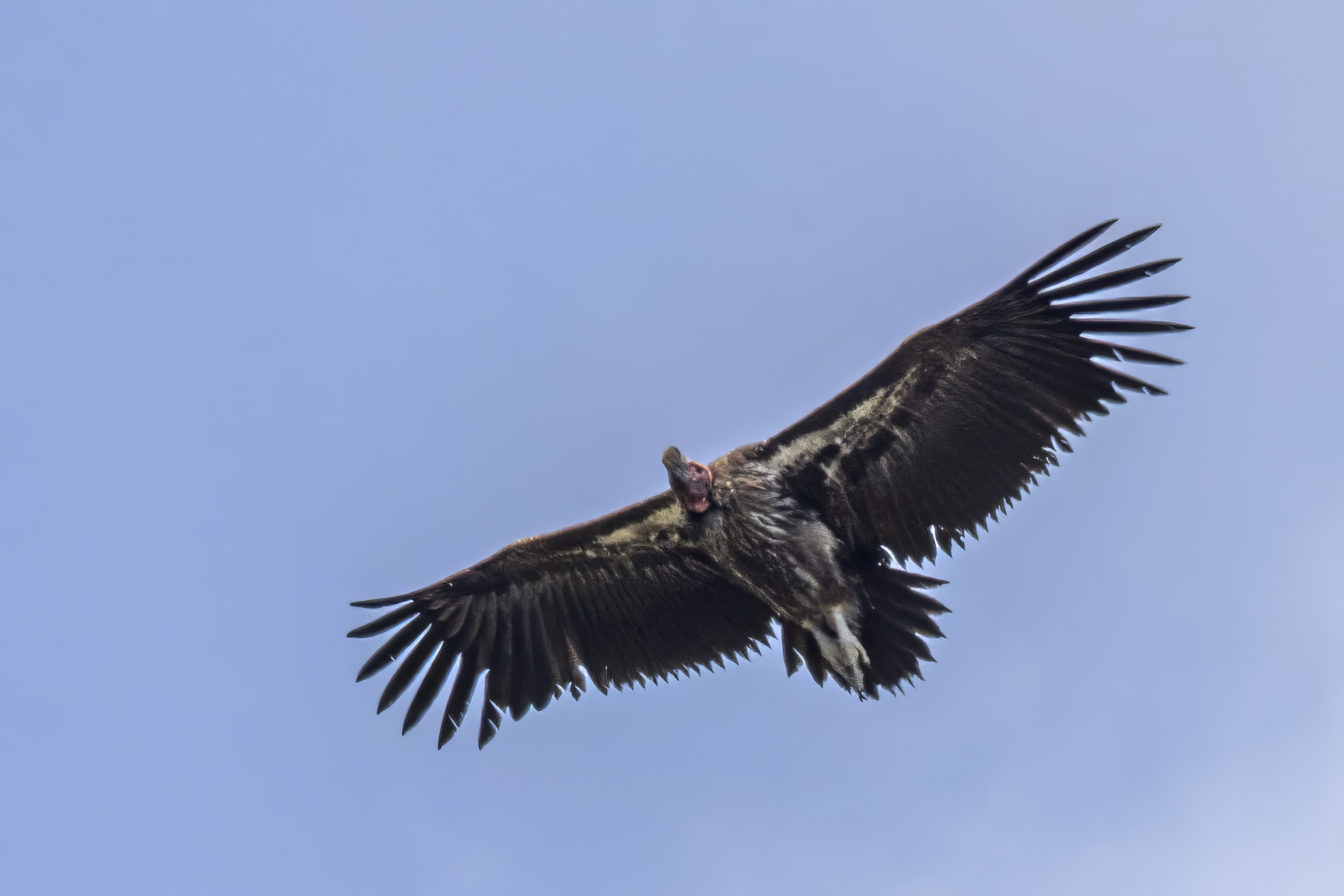
in flight above Kruger National Park, South Africa

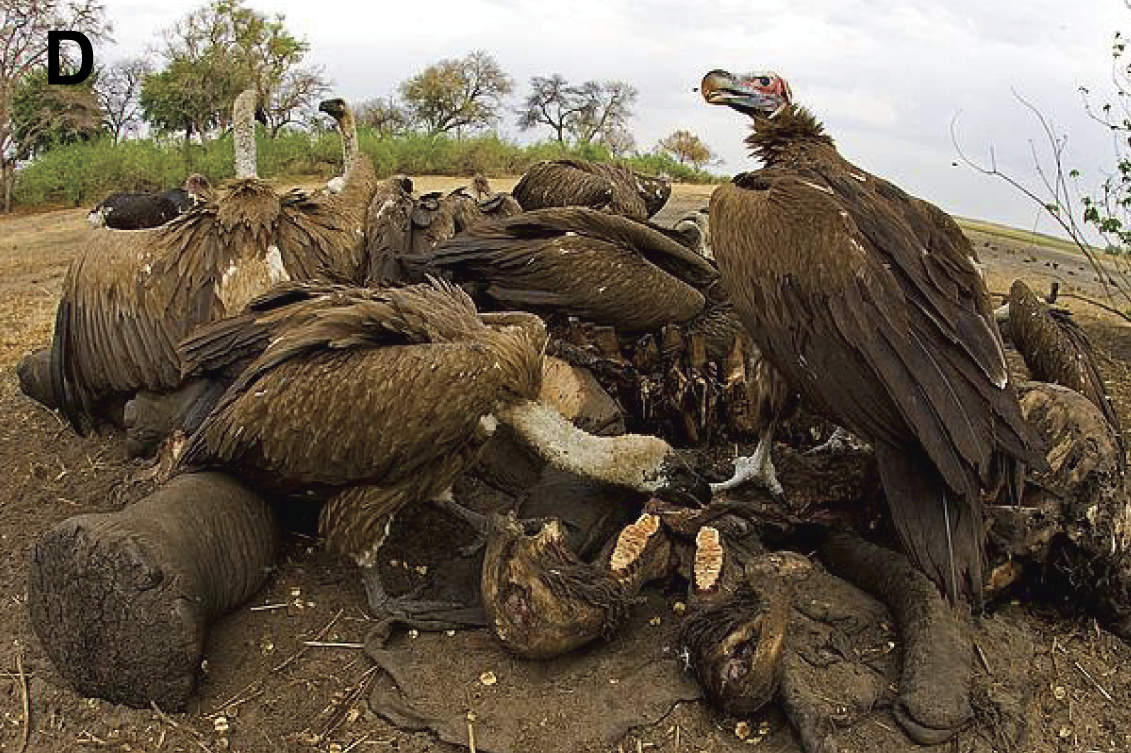
Scavenging on an elephant carcass together with some white-backed vultures

=== Feeding ===
The lappet-faced vulture is a scavenging bird, feeding mostly from animal carcasses, which it finds by sight or by watching other vultures. More so than many African vultures, they often find carrion on their own and start tearing through the skin. They are the most powerful and aggressive of the African vultures, and other vultures will usually cede a carcass to the lappet-faced vulture if it decides to assert itself. This is often beneficial to the less powerful vultures because the Lappet-face can tear through the tough hides and knotty muscles of large mammals that the others cannot penetrate. However hyenas are even more efficient in this regard (if more voracious eaters). However, lappet-faced vultures frequently hang around the edges of the throngs at large carcasses, waiting until the other vultures are done, to feed on remnant skin, tendons, and other coarse tissues that the others will not eat. Big game animals, up to the size of elephants, are preferred as carrion since they provide the most subsistence at a sitting. A full crop can contain up to 1.5 kg (3.3 lb) of meat.

Perhaps more than any other true vulture, lappet-faced vultures have been recorded as regularly feeding on freshly killed smaller mammals, birds, and reptiles. Some of these are probably road-kills or are pirated from eagles or other raptors but they are also believed to occasionally attack live animals, especially young and weak animals, and the nests and young of other birds. Flamingo colonies (including eggs, young and adults), young impalas, and guineafowl have reportedly been predated. They are believed to still hunt from an elevated perch and then drop on their prey, stunning them with the impact and tearing them apart with their substantial bills. Most remains found at nests are from small animals possibly caught alive.

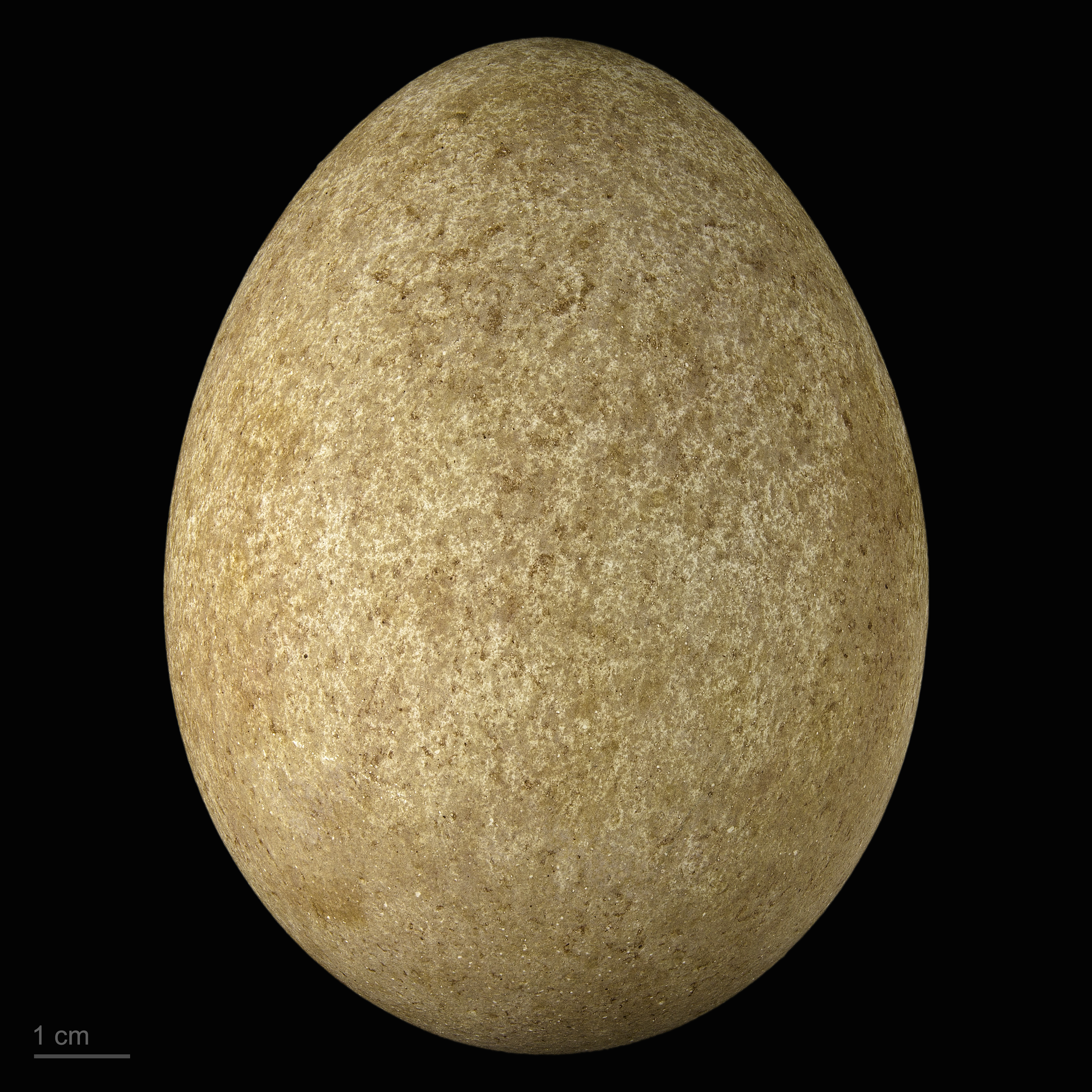
Egg - MHNT

=== Life history ===
Lappet-faced vultures are generally solitary birds. They do not nest in cohesive colonies as do many smaller vultures, with one tree or area usually only having one to two nests in it, though rarely up to 10 nests have been recorded in one area. The home range of a lappet-faced vulture is usually at least 8 to 15 km (5.0 to 9.3 mi). Groups of up to 25 to 50 Lappet-faces may congregate at large carcasses or watering holes, though typically only from one to as many as seven turn up per carcass.

This species nests in November through July in the north of its range, throughout the year in eastern Africa and May to January in southern Africa. The huge nest, a pile of neatly formed sticks, measures 120–220 cm (47–87 in) across and 30–70 cm (12–28 in) deep. The nest is often lined with green leaves, as well as animal hair and skins. Nests are almost always placed in the main fork or top of an Acacia tree, though Balanites and Terminalia trees are sometimes also used, at 5 to 15 m (16 to 49 ft) off the ground. The clutch contains one or two eggs, which are incubated by both parents over the course of 54 to 56 days. The young fledge at 124 to 135 days old, although can be dependent on their parents for up to an age of 1 year or more, sometimes forcing parents to only nest in alternate years. There is a single remarkable record of a lappet-faced vulture pair successfully raising a white-headed vulture. The lappet-faced vulture does not usually breed until it is around six years of age.

== Status ==
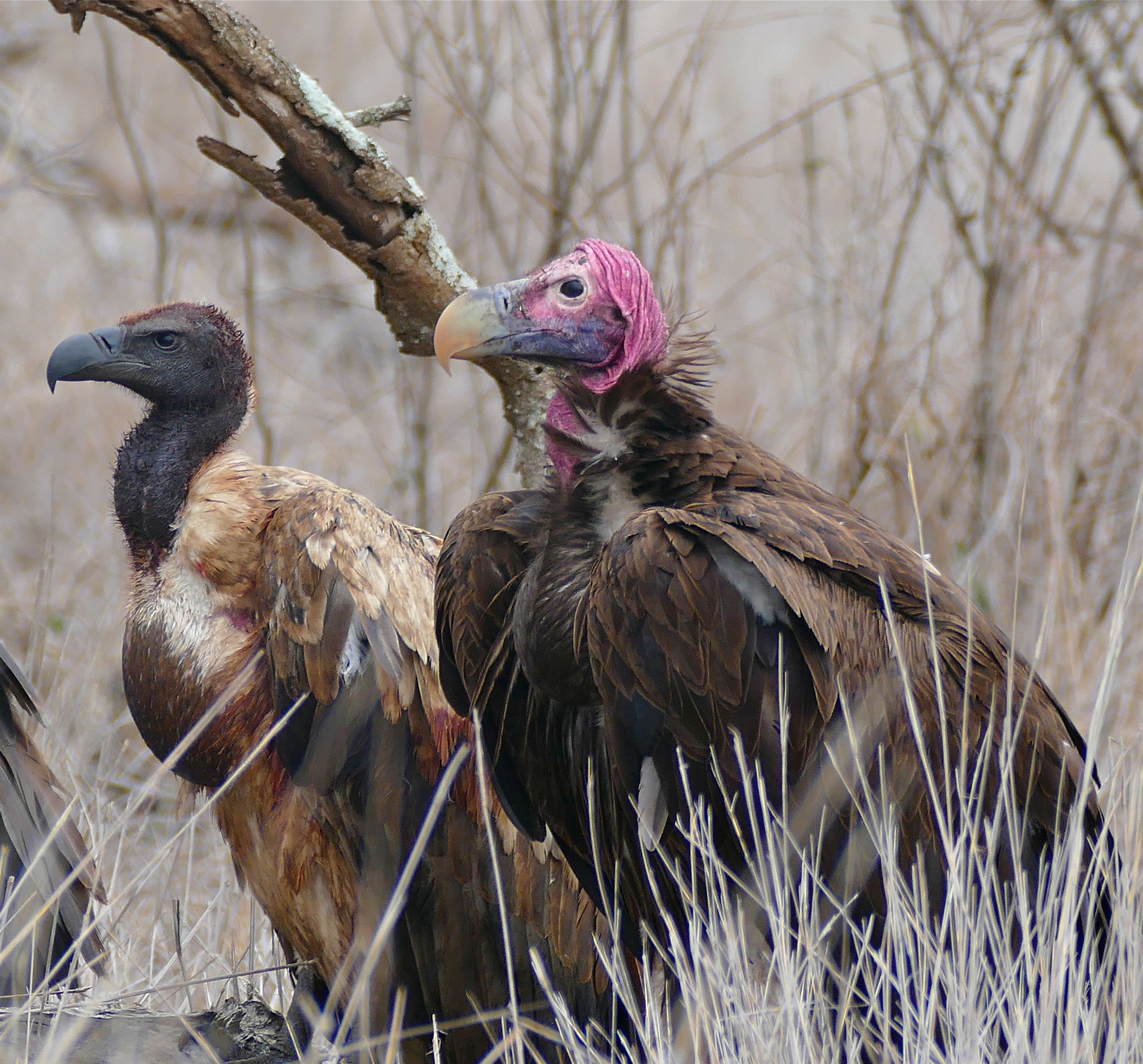
With a white-backed vulture, at Kruger NP

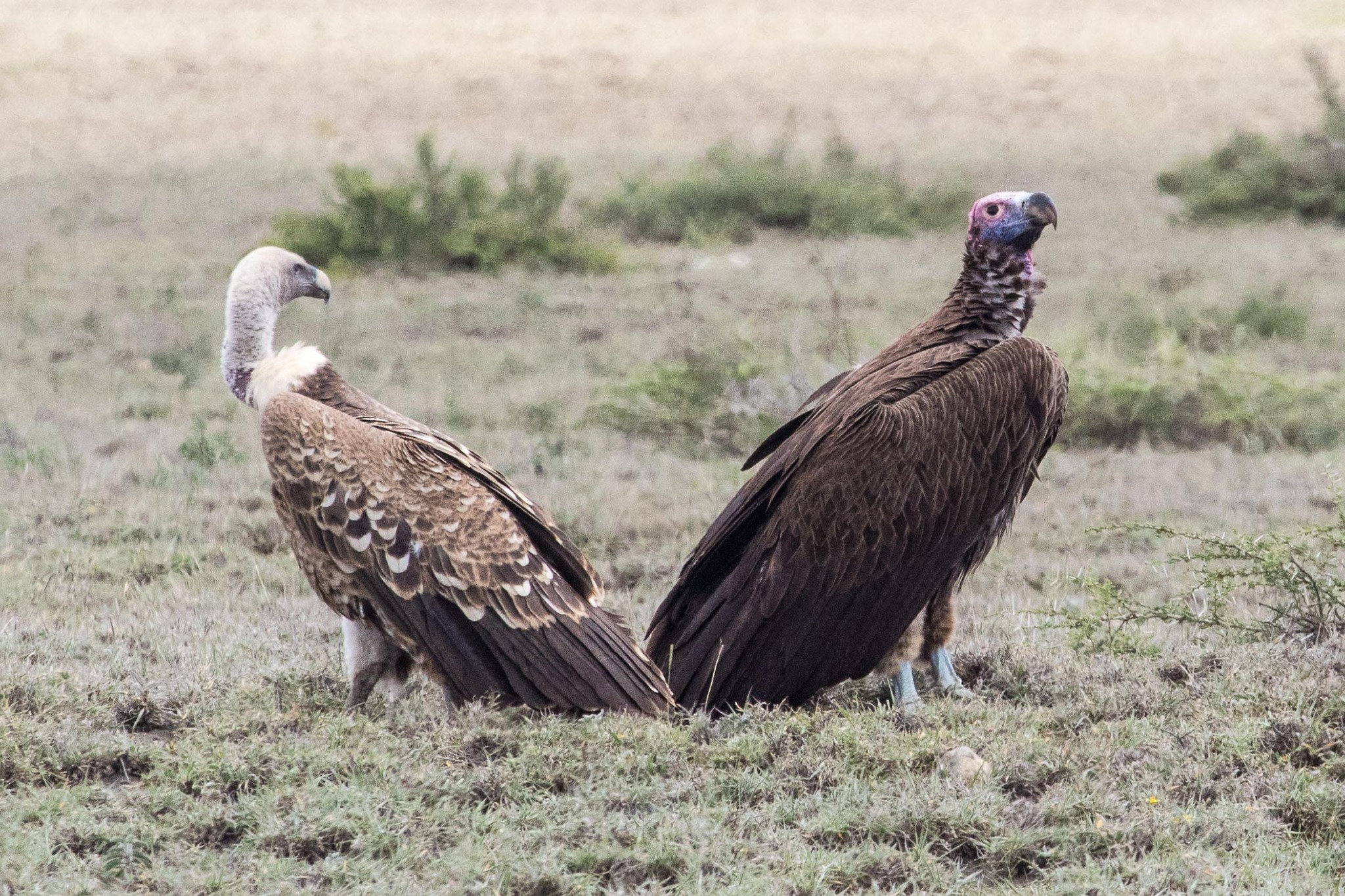
With a Rüppell's vulture, in Tanzania

The lappet-faced vulture's world population is believed to have decreased perceptibly, and as of October 2015 their IUCN status was updated to Endangered. They are declining in the Sahel and several parts of their southern, northern and western distribution in Africa. They are apparently currently stable in Arabia but have a small population there and have been extirpated from Israel as a breeding bird. The declines are almost entirely due to human activities, including disturbances from habitat destruction and cultivation, disturbances at the nesting site (to which the species is reportedly quite sensitive) and ingestion of pesticides, which are usually set out for jackals and other small mammalian carnivores. Domestic cattle, who have replaced natural prey over much of the range, are now often sold off, rather than abandoned, due to the proliferation of markets and abattoirs and rarely left to die and be consumed by vultures. Lappet-faced vultures are also sometimes victims of direct persecution, including shooting and the use of strychnine and other poisons. In Namibia, 86 vultures died after eating poisoned cattle carcasses, because the farmers erroneously believed they were killing and eating the cattle. In some cases the poisoning is done by poachers, who fear the presence of vultures will alert authorities to their activities, the illegal killings of protected species. They are considered Vulnerable at the species level, with an estimated world population of under 9,000 individuals.

On 20 June 2019, the corpses of 468 white-backed vultures, 17 white-headed vultures, 28 hooded vultures, 14 lappet-faced vultures and 10 cape vultures, altogether 537 vultures, besides 2 tawny eagles, were found in northern Botswana. It is suspected that they died after eating the corpses of 3 elephants that were poisoned by poachers, possibly to avoid detection by the birds, which help rangers to track poaching activity by circling above where there are dead animals.

On 3 April 2022 the Israel Nature and Parks Authority announced the first hatching of a lappet-faced vulture since 1994
