= Golden eagles in human culture =

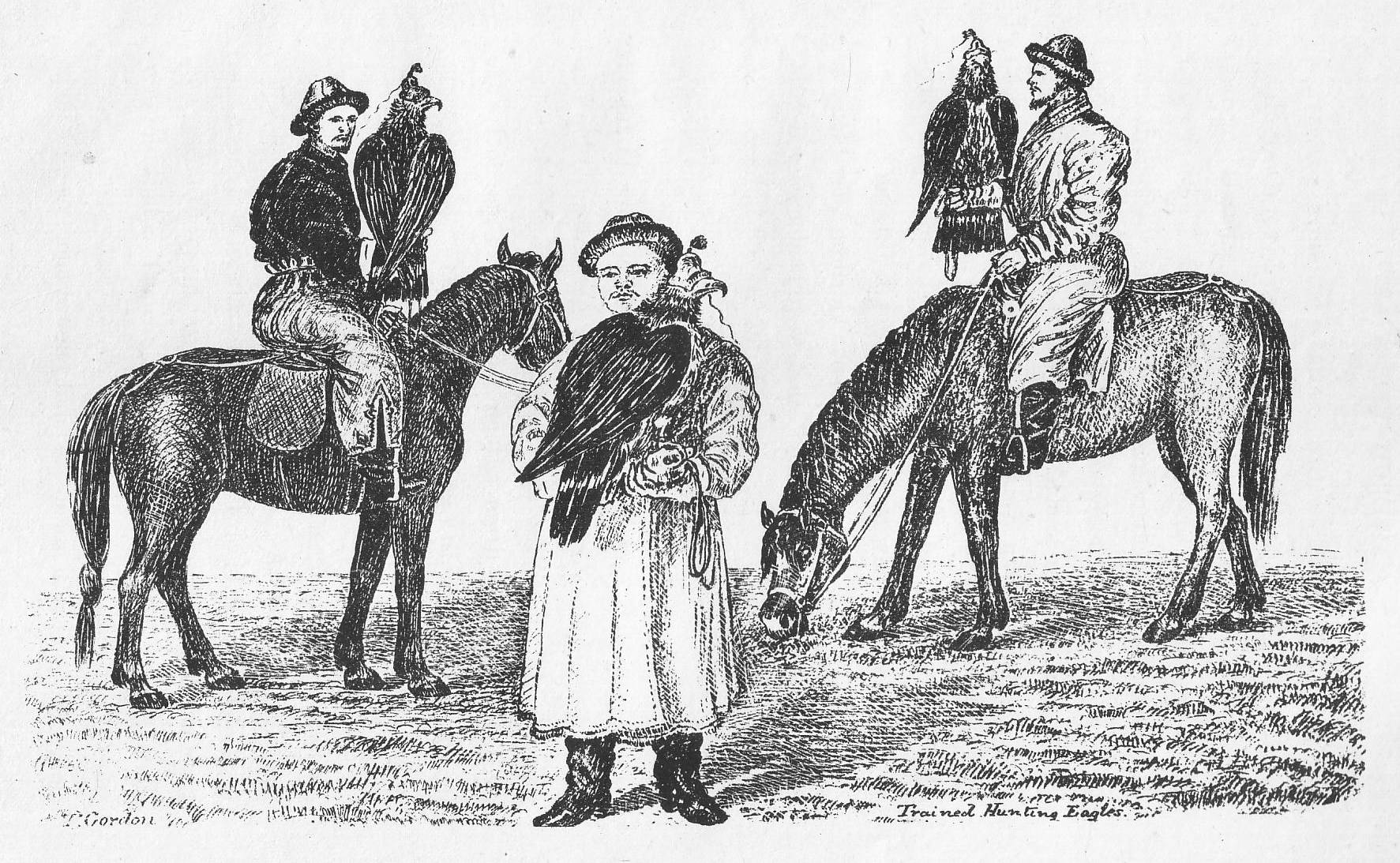
1870s illustration of burkut falconers in Kazakhstan

Mankind has been fascinated by the golden eagle as early as the beginning of recorded history. Most early-recorded cultures regarded the golden eagle with reverence. Only after the Industrial Revolution, when sport-hunting became widespread and commercial stock farming became internationally common, did humans start to widely regard golden eagles as a threat to their livelihoods. This period also brought about the firearm and industrialized poisons, which made it easy for humans to kill the evasive and powerful birds. The following are various reportages of the significance of eagles, many likely pertaining to the golden eagles, in early cultures and older religions as well as national and military insignias.

== Ancient mythology ==
The Greeks and Romans believed Zeus and Jupiter respectively to be represented by the eagle.

== Falconry ==
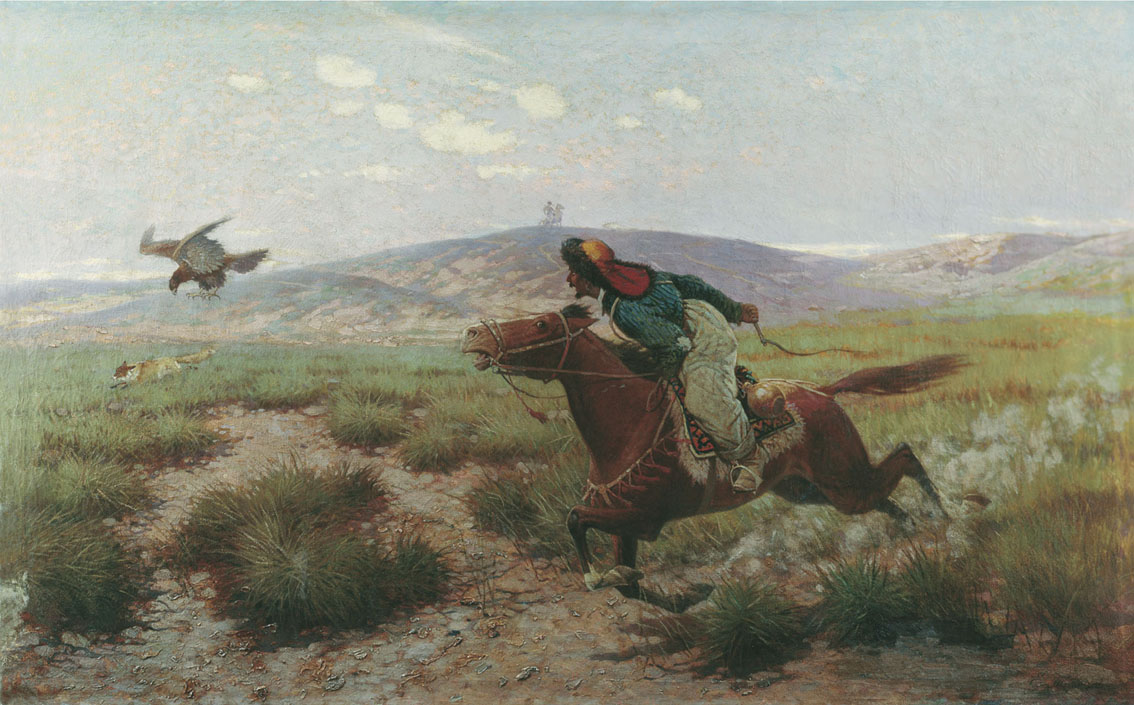
Russian depiction falconers fox-hunting with a golden eagle in Orenburg.

Golden eagles can be trained to be highly effective falconry birds, though their size, strength, and aggressiveness require careful handling to control the risk of injury to the falconer. They have been used in this practice at least since the Middle Ages. In Asia, they were reportedly used in teams to hunt such animals as deer, antelope and wolves. Concurrently in Europe, their use for falconry was typically reserved for emperors and kings, which is why the common names for the golden eagle in various European languages roughly translate as the “royal eagle”. In the United States falconers seldom use golden eagles, as the similarly aggressive Ferruginous hawk is more available and provides a similar hunting experience with most of the same game species with lower risk of injury to the falconer. The most common interaction of American falconers with golden eagles is in trying to avoid them in order to reduce golden eagle attacks on their trained birds. The very athletic golden eagle is approximately as swift as the large falcons, is quite willing to attack smaller raptors when the opportunity is available, and is often capable of flying down a falcon or hawk. Experienced falconers will consequently not fly their birds if golden eagles are spotted, and usually prefer to fly later in the day when the golden eagles have typically already fed.

The culture in which falconry with golden eagles is prominent today is amongst the Kyrgyz people of the Tien Shan Mountains of southeastern Kazakhstan and Kyrgyzstan. This practice is also culturally prominent in western Mongolia and Xinjiang. There are around 250 active eagle hunters in Bayan-Ölgii Province of Mongolia, and 50 in Kazakhstan. In these cultures, the golden eagle is considered a highly valued working animal which will be used for 15 years or more. Falconers carry their bird on a gloved right hand, usually with a wooden brace to support its considerable weight. In the Tien Shan Mountains, falconry mostly occurs in late fall and early winter. It is possible for up to 30 to 50 foxes to be caught by a single eagle during this season.

Full-grown wolves are not believed to be viable prey for wild golden eagles; they are too dangerous due to their large size and large, powerful bite. Despite this, falconers occasionally use golden eagles to hunt wolves. The steppe wolf (Canis lupus campestris), a relatively small-bodied race of wolf at around 35 kg (77 lb), is the main wolf reportedly hunted by golden eagles in falconry. There are records that some experienced golden eagles successfully kill subadult or even adult wolves. However, even a well-trained golden eagle has a risk of injury so most falconers do not risk casting a mature eagle at an adult wolf. Some wolves prove particularly challenging quarry: there is the tale of one that was injured by 11 successive eagles but foiled their attempts – killing each one – until it was finally dispatched thanks to the efforts of a twelfth eagle.

== Heraldry and myth ==
Albanian Flag

Mexican coat of arms

Coat of arms of Egypt

Coat of arms of Bayan-Ölgii, Mongolia

The golden eagle is the most common national animal in the world, with five nations—Albania, Germany, Austria, Mexico and Kazakhstan—making it the national animal. It is also a common motif in the national symbols of countries that have not officially made it the national animal or national bird. The reasons for this are various, but among the nations that use the golden eagle as or in a state symbol, there are two clear traditions that help explain the modern usage. Among European countries, the golden eagle was the model for the aquila, the most prominent symbol of the Roman legions and more generally the Roman civilization that had such a powerful impact on Western culture; furthermore, some classical Roman traditions were carried on by the Eastern Roman Empire in the Southern and Eastern of Europe and the Holy Roman Empire in Central and Western Europe, transmitting the use of the golden eagle to several modern states. This association of the golden eagle with Rome has also led to the adoption of similar symbols in other countries; for instance, the adoption of the related and physically similar bald eagle as the national bird of the United States was inspired by the conception of the United States as a modern reincarnation of the Roman Republic, a theme that recurs in other elements as well (including the prevalence of neoclassical architecture in American public buildings and the use of Roman terminology—such as naming the upper house of Congress the Senate—to hark back to the Roman model). Adolf Hitler used a golden eagle regularly as a symbol for the Nazi Party, including large monuments or statues on buildings and bridges as well as the pins worn on lapels of Nazi officers. In this case, the eagle was used as to stir up nationalism, since it was a longtime symbol (Hoheitszeichen) for the German Empire dating back centuries in use for the coat of arms of Prussia and the Holy Roman Empire.

Another large tradition of using the golden eagle can be found in the Arab world, where the eagle is historically a symbol of power in Arabic poetry, and was according to legend the personal emblem of Saladin. The specific depiction of golden eagle legendarily considered to be Saladin's was adopted by the Arab nationalist movement, and currently appears on the arms of Egypt, Iraq, and Palestine; it had previously appeared on the arms of the People's Democratic Republic of Yemen (1967–1990) and on the arms of the Libyan Arab Republic (1970–1972). The current emblem of Yemen displays a golden eagle, but it is not that of Saladin.

== Religion ==
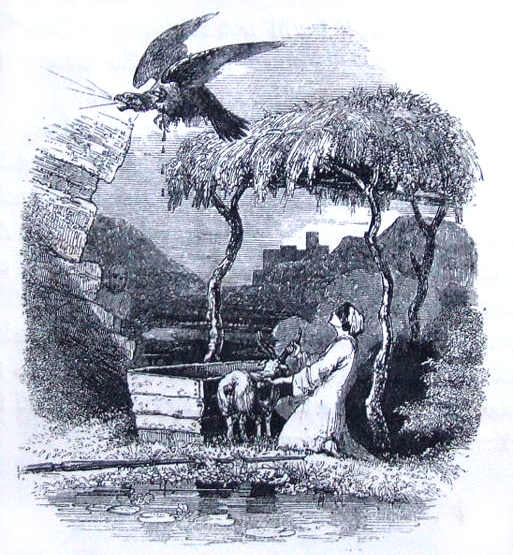
Lleu rises in the form of an eagle. Image from The Mabinogion, Charlotte Guest, 1877.

Eagles are often prominent in The Bible, though are sometimes mixed with carrion birds and are not specifically identifiable to species. As the most widespread eagle in the Middle East and Eurasia, certainly many said references must pertain to the golden eagle. The use of eagles seems generally heavier in the Torah or the Old Testament than in the New Testament. In biblical times, eagles and other meat-eating birds were banned from being eaten since their diet was considered unclean. However, eagles are mentioned in the Bible as being admired for their swiftness, great physical power and their seemingly endless endurance. Eagles are one of four dimensions of creation, as a messenger of God, and a skilled predator. Eagles are also widespread in the Bible for symbolism. For example, due to the perceived high level of parental care, eagles were associated with protection and even paralleled to God carrying the Israelites out of Egypt. However, the biblical word for eagle is also utilised for the Cinereous vulture, and it is likely that it actually is the subject of most of these verses.

Many Eurasian cultures and faiths also feature eagles quite prominently. In Hellenistic religion, the golden eagle is the signature bird of the god Zeus, a connection most notable in the myth of Ganymede, where the god adopted the form of a golden eagle to kidnap the boy, as well as the eagle-like daimon Aetos Dios. At least a few sources also associate it with Helios. In Norse mythology, the golden eagle sits atop Yggdrasil, the great ash tree that runs through the universe. A squirrel, Ratsatosk, carries messages and insults between the eagle at the crown and a serpent gnawing at the tree roots. In many cultures, eagles were viewed as a link between terrestrial mankind and celestial deities. Eagles were particularly prominent in Roman culture. Many banners, coins and insignias from Rome feature eagles. In Roman religion, the eagle was both the symbol and the messenger of the Roman sky-god, Jupiter. When an emperor died, his body was burned in a funeral pyre and an eagle was released above his ashes to carry his soul to the heavens.

Eagles play a small role in Celtic mythology. The eagle is said to be the oldest of birds, and a form that may be taken by a deity or other mythological figure. In the Welsh tale of Lleu Llaw Gyffes, the protagonist escapes death at the hands of a hunter by taking an eagle's form and killing the hunter who assaulted him.

== In North America ==
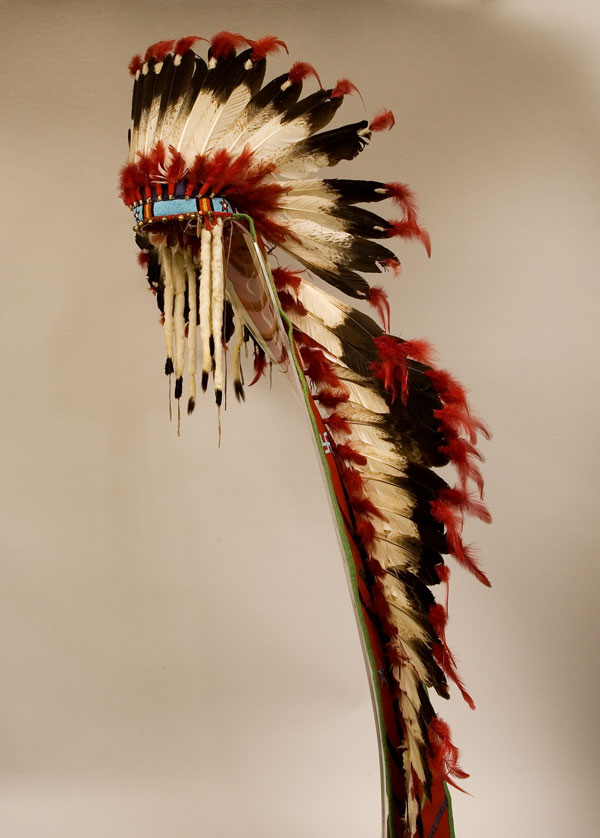
A ceremonial head-dress made by the Nez Perce people from the tail feathers of juvenile golden eagles in what is now Idaho

In ancient North America, eagles were more prominent than in Eurasia. The eagle is still considered a sacred bird in many Indigenous American cultures. The feathers in particular are central to a number of religious and spiritual ceremonies. While most prominent among the Plains cultures, eagles are also held sacred in the spiritual ways of a number of Native Americans in the United States and First Nations Peoples in Canada, as well as among some of the peoples of Mesoamerica.

Feathers are often worn on Native American headdresses and have been compared to the Bible and cross of Christianity. Some nations use eagle feathers in the construction of prayer sticks, doctors’ rattles and sacred medicine pipes. Per Thomas E. Mails: "in the mind of the Plains warrior in the 18th and 19th century, the male golden eagle flew above all the creatures of the world and saw everything. Nothing matched his courage and swiftness, and his talons had the strength of a giant's hand. The eagle was very holy." The tail feathers of juvenile golden eagles are used in some ceremonies as well as to honor noteworthy achievements and qualities such as exceptional leadership and bravery. several Sioux communities have an “eagle dance”, where the dancers imitate the motions of a flying eagle, accompanied by a traditional song for the eagles. Historically, plains warriors have not been allowed to use weapons when capturing eagles for their feathers. The most common method to capture golden eagles is to lay a trap, consisting of an earth-colored tarp, with a dead jackrabbit on it, over a pit containing a crouching warrior. When the eagle comes to land on the tarp, the warrior grabs the eagle by the top of its feet to pull it in and kill it. The hunter may simply take some feathers and let the bird go free. If the warrior fails to grab the eagle properly it sometimes results in serious injury to the human. Among the Hopi people, one of two eagle nestlings (it is strictly forbidden to capture one unless there are two nestlings in the nest) may be captured and raised with great care, until it reaches an age where feathers can be taken.

Current United States eagle feather law (50 CFR 22) stipulates that only individuals of certifiable Native American ancestry enrolled in a federally recognized tribe are legally authorized to obtain eagle feathers for religious or spiritual use. Thus, the supply of eagle material for traditional ceremonial use can be guaranteed and ceremonial eagle items can be passed on as heirlooms by their traditional owners without the restrictions that would usually apply. Commercial trade in golden eagles or their feathers or body parts is not legalized by these exceptions.

In Aztec religion, eagles are associated with the god Huitzilopochtli. Eagle warriors were one of the two main leading military special forces of the Aztec armies.

== Postage stamps ==
The golden eagle is the eighth-most common bird depicted on postage stamps with 155 stamps issued by 71 stamp-issuing entities.

== Sports ==
The Kent State Golden Flashes, representing Kent State University in Kent, OH, take their name from the golden eagle. The university mascot Flash was created in 1985, and the current costume was designed in 1994. Although the golden eagle was not the initial inspiration behind the nickname, the university tried several depictions for what represent a "Golden Flash" before settling on the golden eagle.

== Other uses ==
J. R. R. Tolkien used an image of an immature golden eagle from T. A. Coward's 1919 work The Birds of the British Isles and Their Eggs for an illustration depicting Bilbo Baggins awaking next to Gwaihir, a giant eagle of Middle-earth.

American aircraft manufacturer Cessna manufactured its Model 421 series of aircraft between the late 1960s and mid-1980s, calling the type the Golden Eagle.

Before every football game, Auburn University has a golden eagle fly around the stadium as tradition, despite the official school athletic name being the Tigers. Kent State University, named the Golden Flashes, eventually refined the nickname to refer to a golden eagle.

Ultramar, a Canadian petroleum retailer uses a Golden eagle as their logo.

Golden Eagle Syrup, an American syrup company, uses a Golden eagle as their logo.
