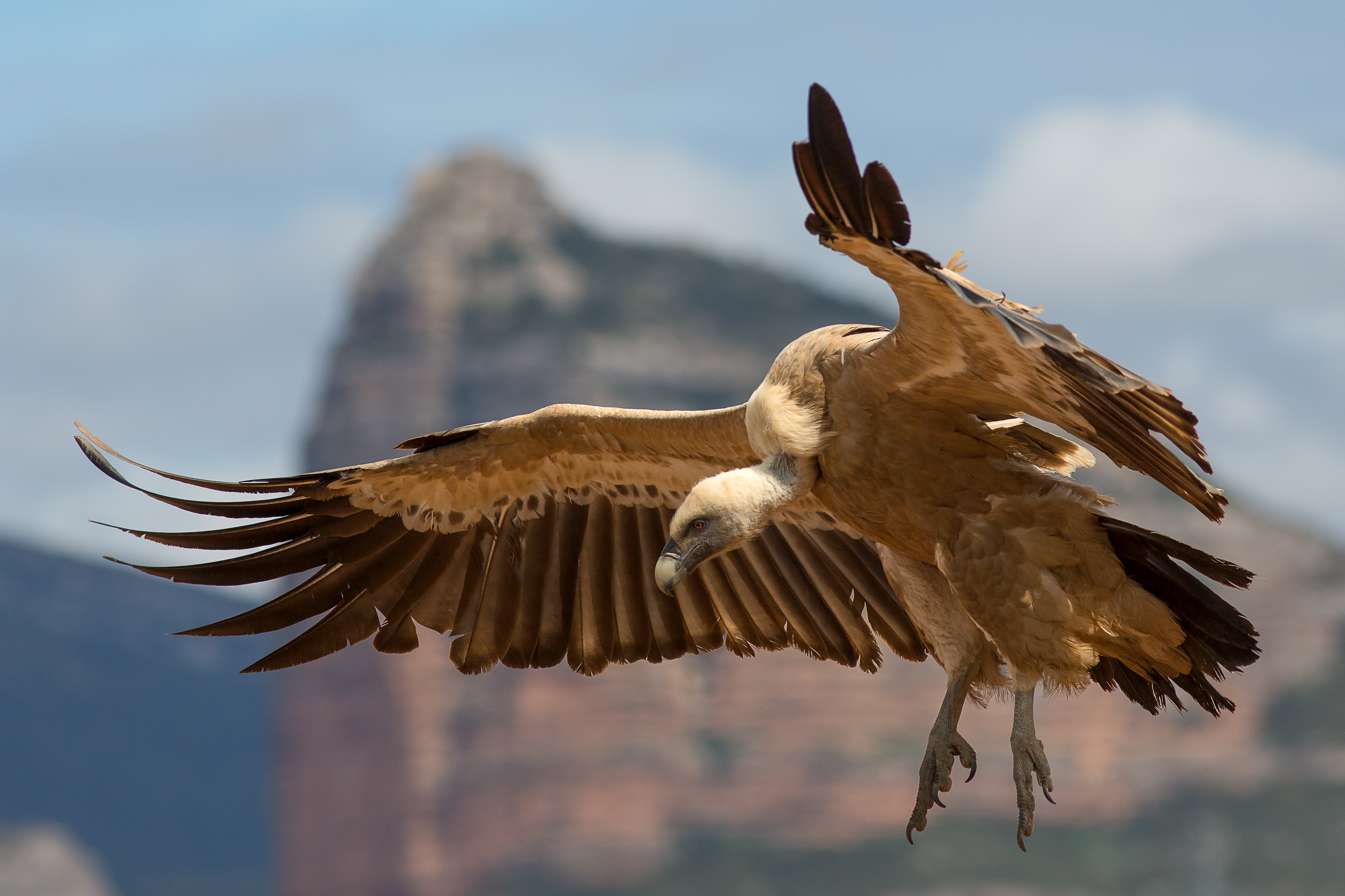
- Eurasian griffon vulture in Spain

Conservation status
- Least Concern (IUCN 3.1)

Scientific classification
- Kingdom: Animalia
- Phylum: Chordata
- Class: Aves
- Order: Accipitriformes
- Family: Accipitridae
- Genus: Gyps
- Species: G. fulvus

Binomial name
- Gyps fulvus (Hablizl, 1783)

Subspecies
- G. f. fulvus (Hablizl, 1783); G. f. fulvescens Hume, 1869
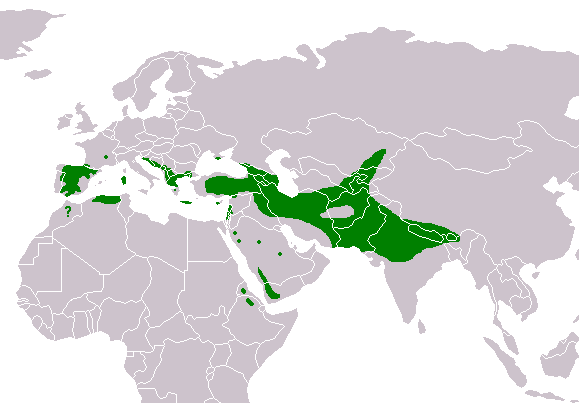
- Range of griffon vulture

Synonyms
- Vultur fulvus

= Eurasian griffon vulture =

Species of bird

The Eurasian griffon vulture (Gyps fulvus) is a large Old World vulture in the bird of prey family Accipitridae. It is also known as the Eurasian griffon or griffon vulture, although the latter term is sometimes used for the genus Gyps as a whole.

== Description ==
The griffon vulture is 93–122 cm (37–48 in) long with a 2.3–2.8 m (7.5–9.2 ft) wingspan. In the nominate race the males weigh 6.2 to 10.5 kg (14 to 23 lb) and females typically weigh 6.5 to 10.5 kg (14 to 23 lb), while in the Indian subspecies (G. f. fulvescens), the vultures average 7.1 kg (16 lb). Extreme adult weights have been reported from 4.5 to 15 kg (9.9 to 33.1 lb), the latter likely a weight attained in captivity. Hatched naked, it is a typical Old World vulture in appearance, with a white head, broad wings and short tail feathers. It has a white neck ruff and yellow bill. The buff body and wing coverts contrast with the dark flight feathers.

== Distribution and habitat ==
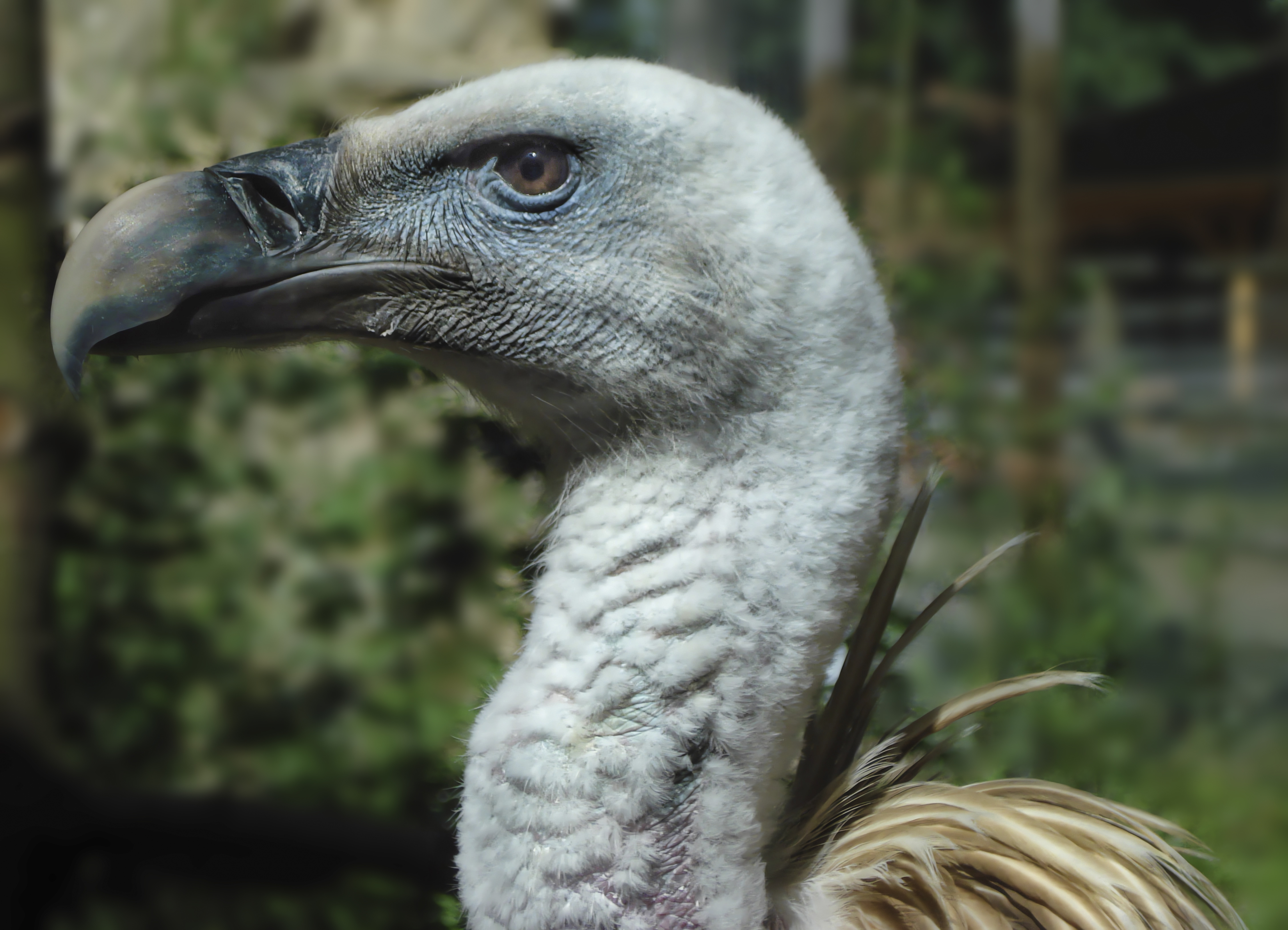
Gyps fulvus (portrait)

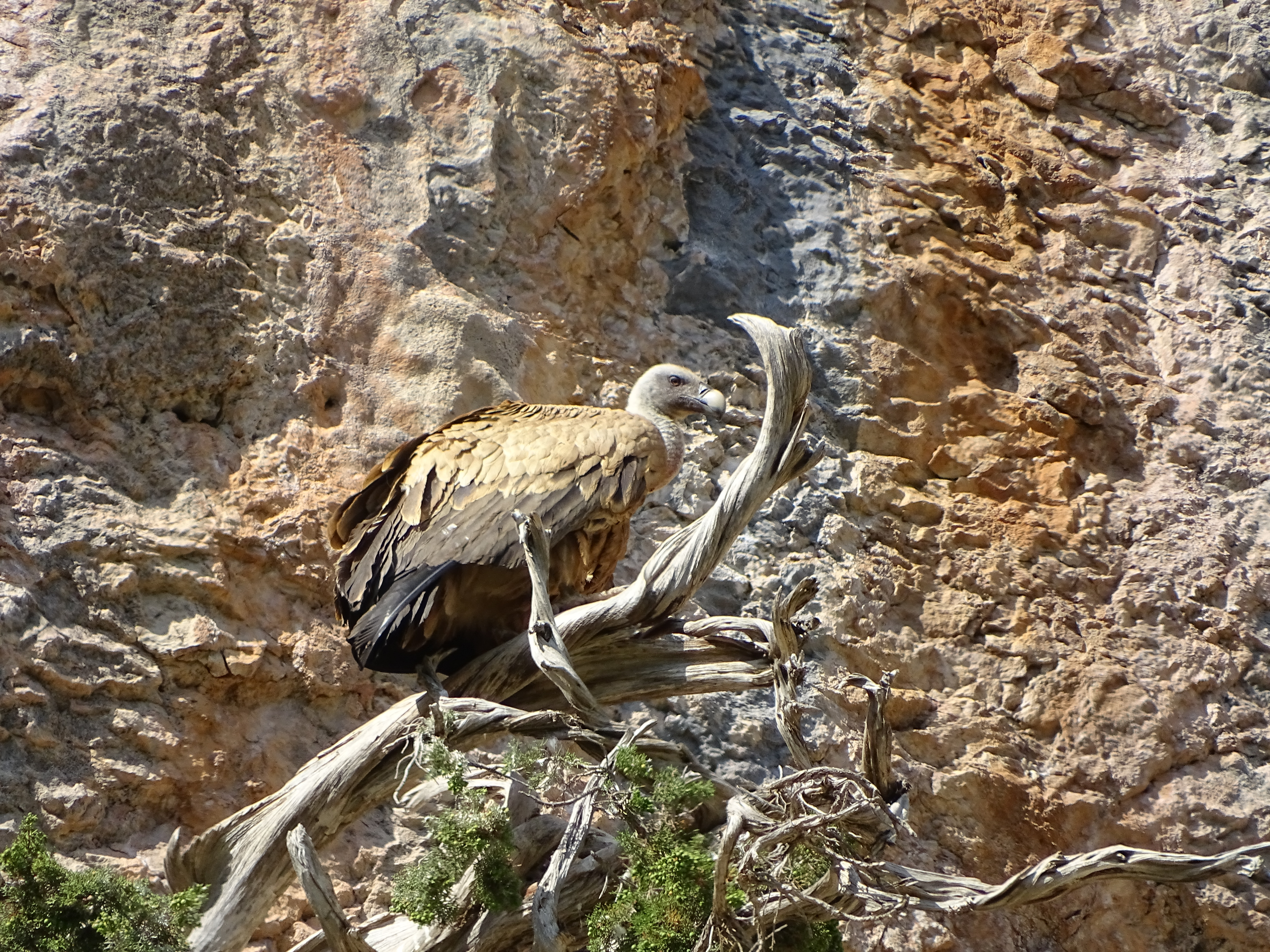
Eurasian griffon vulture in Catalonia

The Eurasian griffon vulture is resident in parts of the Iberian Peninsula, in the eastern Atlas Mountains, the eastern Alps, parts of Anatolia and the Caucasus, parts of the Arabian Peninsula and the Iranian plateau, and in the Tian Shan and Altai Mountains.

In Portugal a few hundred pairs of griffons nest, but their distribution is strongly asymmetric. The main areas of reproduction are located in Douro International Natural Park, which is home to more than half of the Portuguese population. Though permanently resident in the interior of the country, the griffon vulture often ventures west when the breeding season is over and can occasionally reach the Tagus Estuary Natural Reserve and Cape St. Vincent.

In Ireland, the first record of a griffon vulture occurred in 1843 in Cork. In 2000, a vulture took up residence on Guernsey island.

In Croatia, a Eurasian griffon vulture colony lives near the town of Beli on Cres island. There they breed at low elevations, with some nests at 10 m (33 ft). Therefore, contact with people is common. The population makes frequent incursions in the Slovenian territory, especially in the mountain Stol above Kobarid. The bird is protected in an area called Kuntrep on the Croatian island of Krk.

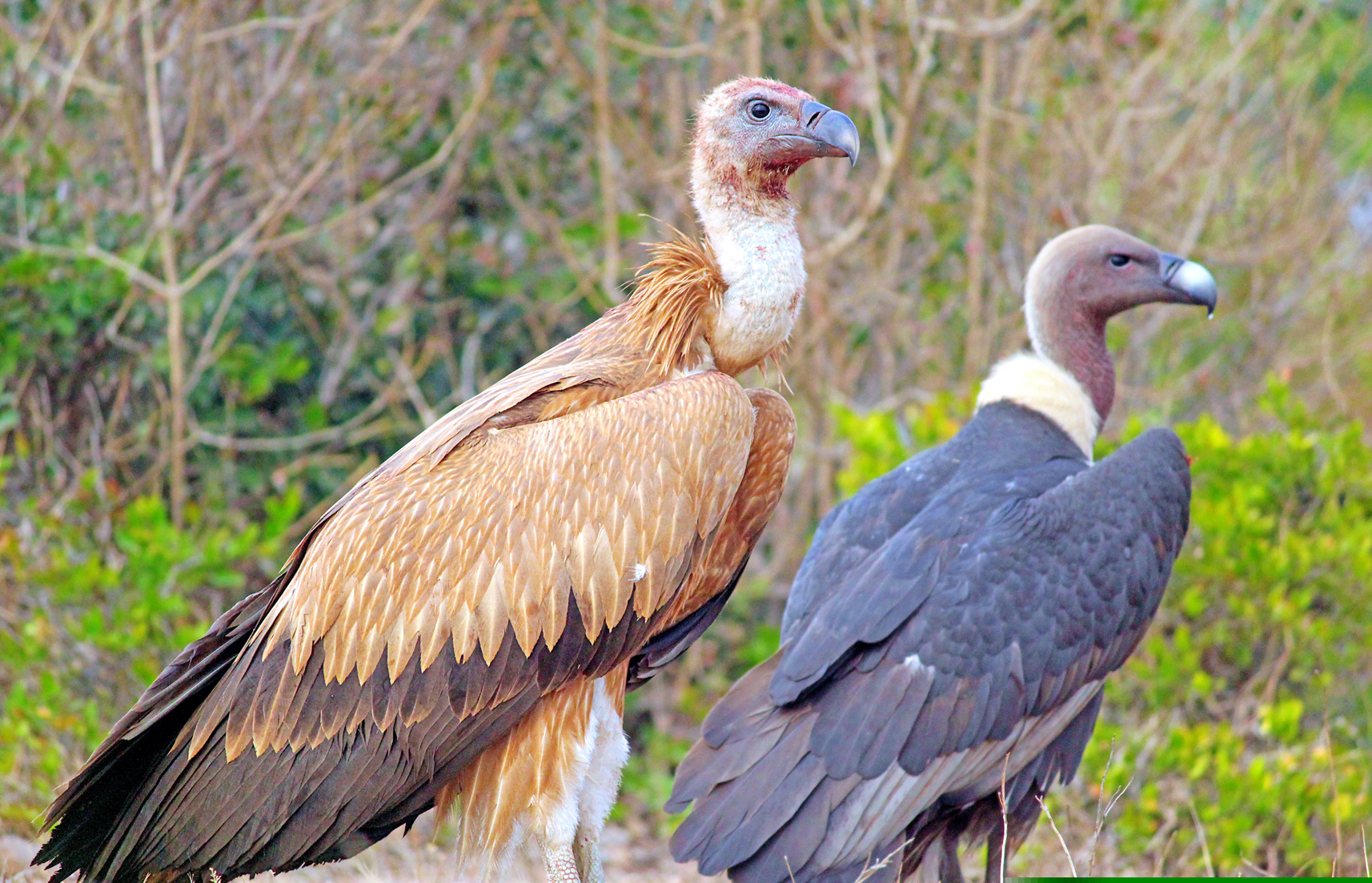
Griffon vulture beside a white-rumped vulture (Gyps bengalensis), showing the difference in size and coloration between the two species

In Serbia, there are around 450-500 individuals with about 110 pairs of Eurasian griffon vultures around Zlatar mountain and also 35 birds in the canyon of the Trešnjica river. In Greece, there are nearly 1000 Eurasian griffon vultures. The majority of this population resides in Crete, which hosts the largest insular population of the species in the world. On Crete they inhabit mountainous areas, sometimes in groups of up to 20. In Cyprus, there was a colony of fewer than 30 Eurasian griffon vultures at Episkopi, in the south of the island in 2006.

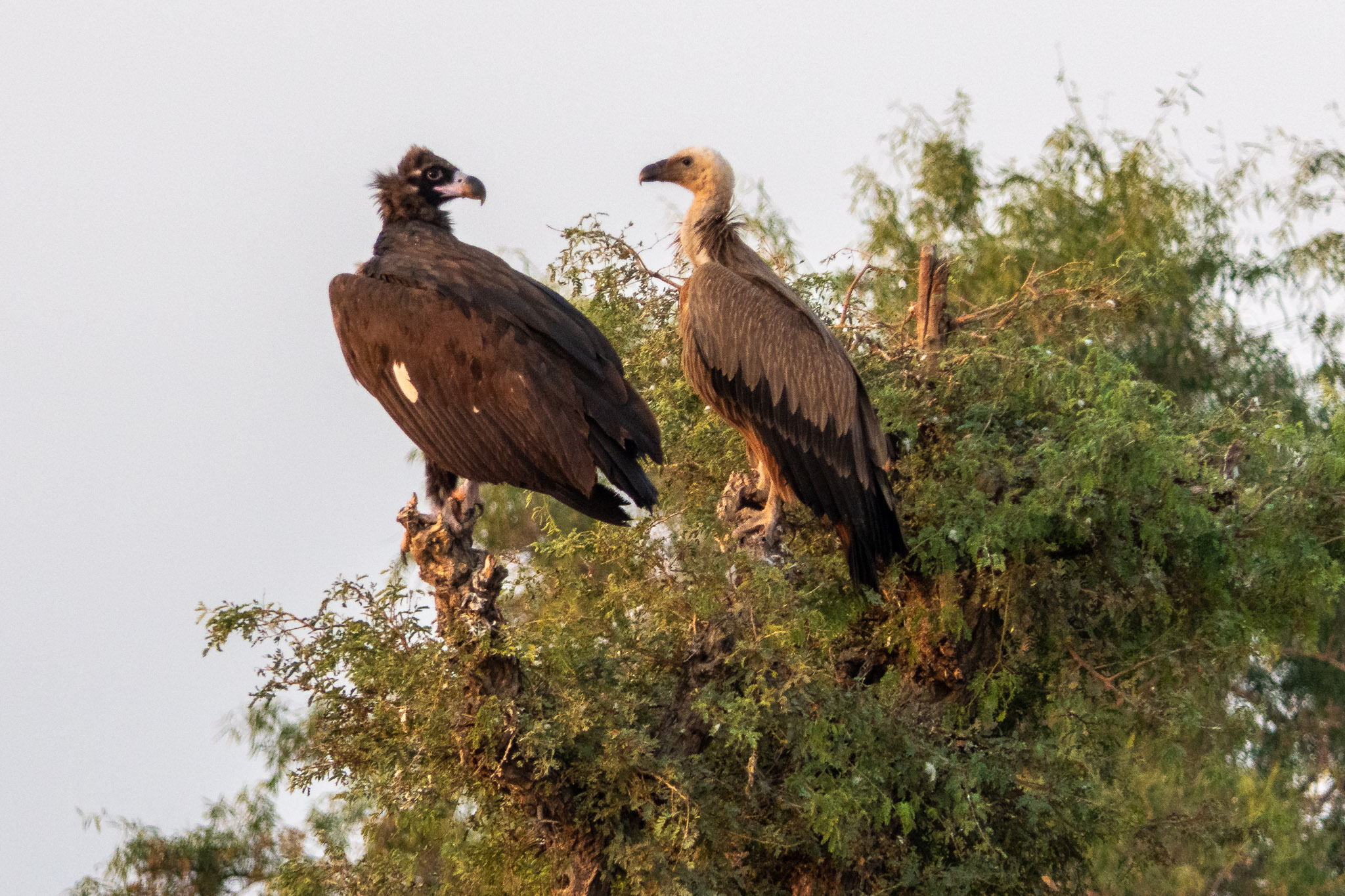
Griffon vulture beside a cinereous vulture

In Germany, the species died out in the mid-18th century. Some 200 vagrant birds, probably from the Pyrenees, were sighted in 2006, and several dozen of the vagrants sighted in Belgium the following year crossed into Germany.

In Armenia there are 46-54 pairs according to last estimation of population; the trend demonstrates a slight increase.

== Behaviour and ecology ==
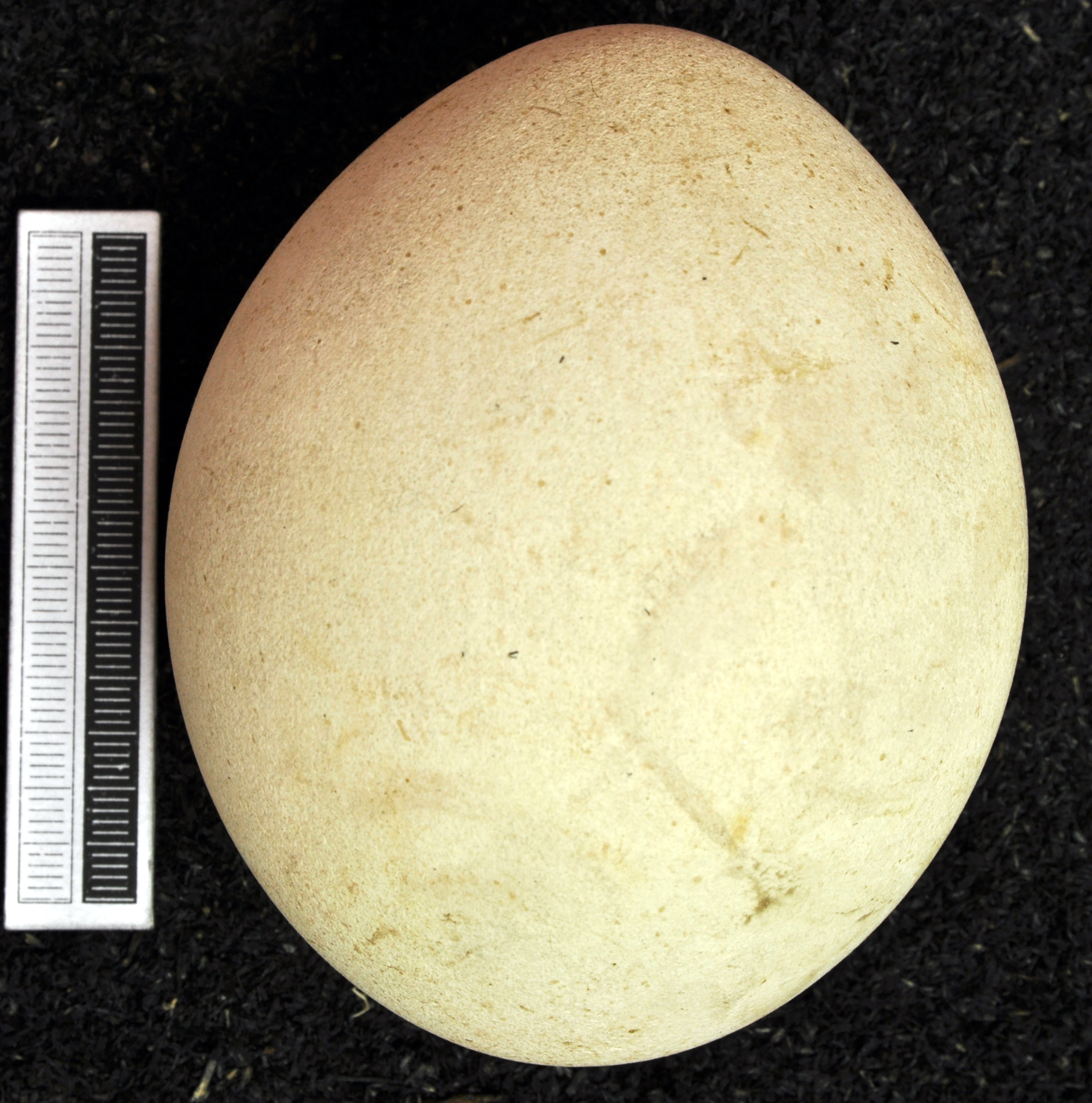
Egg

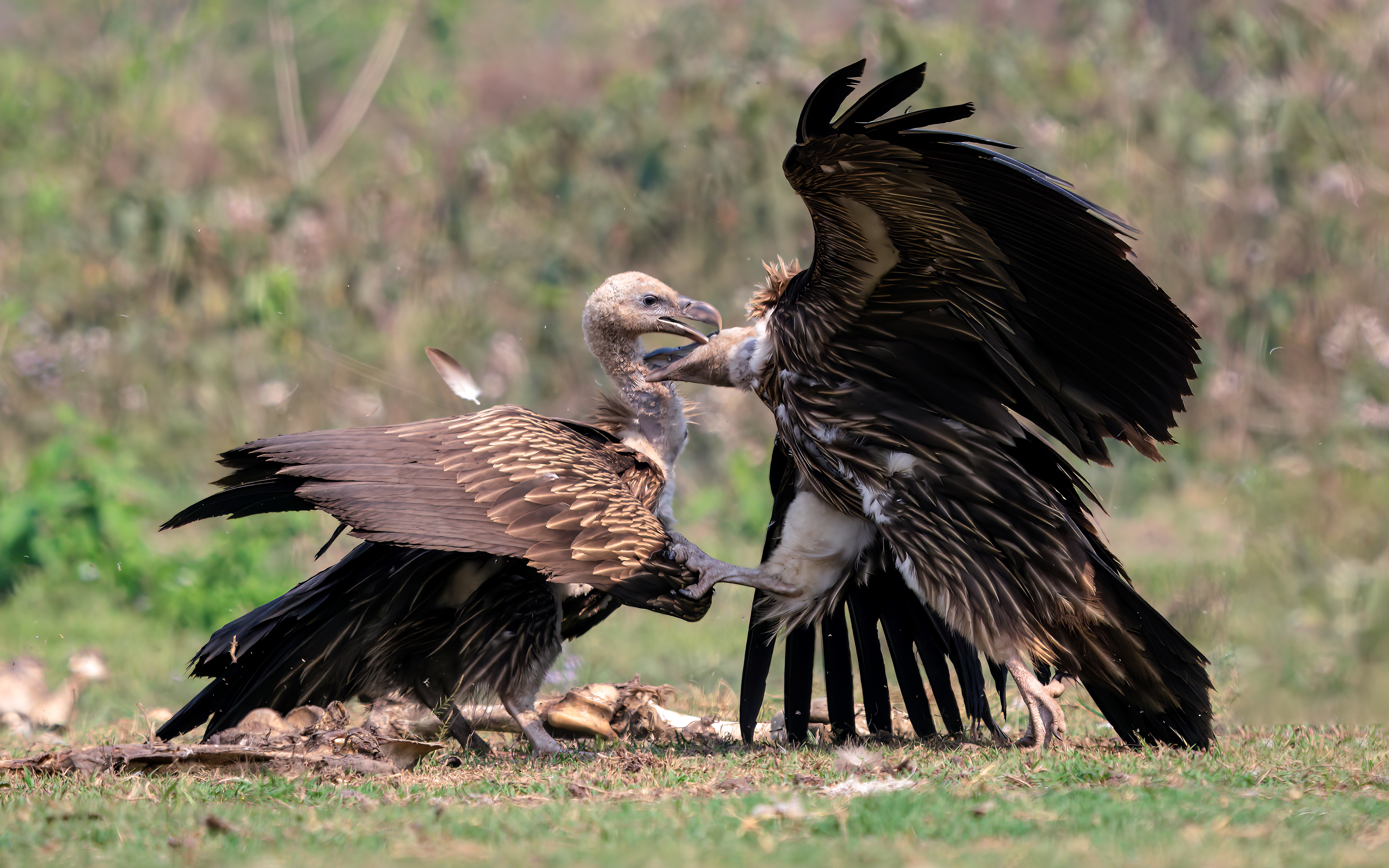
Two Griffion vultures fighting in Chitwan National Park, Nepal

The Griffion vulture breeds on crags in mountains in southern Europe, north Africa, and Asia, laying one egg. Griffon vultures may form loose colonies. The population is mostly resident. Density Dependence in this colonial species has been shown to affect annual reproductive success with eyries in protected location (caves, potholes and sheltered ledges) producing more fledglings, and used preferentially, than low-quality eyries (exposed ledges and open crevices), which were only used when the number of breeding individuals increased.

The maximum recorded lifespan of the griffon vulture is 41.4 years for an individual in captivity.

=== Physiology ===
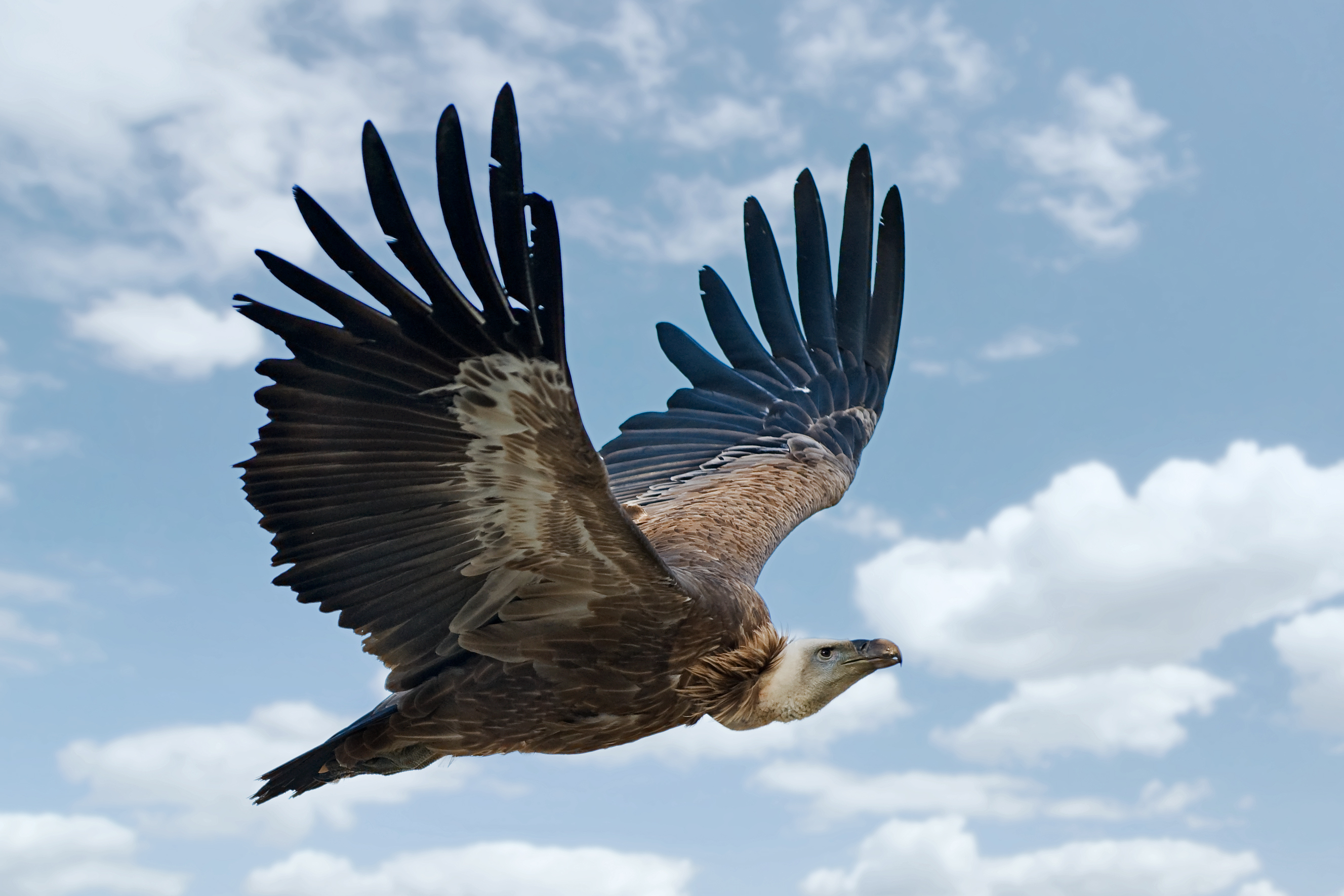
Griffon vulture in flight

Griffon vultures have been used as model organisms for the study of soaring and thermoregulation. The energy costs of level flight tend to be high, prompting alternatives to flapping in larger birds. Vultures in particular utilize more efficient flying methods such as soaring. Compared to other birds, which elevate their metabolic rate to upwards of 16 times their basal metabolic rate in flight, soaring griffon vultures expend about 1.43 times their basal metabolic rate in flight. Griffon vultures are also efficient flyers in their ability to return to a resting heart rate after flight within ten minutes.

As large scavengers, griffon vultures have not been observed to seek shelter for thermoregulation. Vultures use their bald heads as a means to thermoregulate in both extreme cold and hot temperatures. Changes in posture can increase bare skin exposure from 7% to 32%. This change allows for the more than doubling of convective heat loss in still air. Griffon vultures have also been found to tolerate increased body temperatures as a response to high ambient temperatures. By allowing their internal body temperature to change independently of their metabolic rate, griffon vultures minimize their loss of water and energy in thermoregulating. These adaptations have allowed the Griffon vulture to have one of the widest thermal neutral zones of any bird.

=== Intraspecific competition ===
Griffon vultures have shown no age difference in their feeding rates. Feeding rates do tend to increase when more food is available. Studies connected with reintroduction of the vultures have found that older adults are more inclined to display aggressive behaviour and signs of dominance. The sexes have shown no difference in competitive behaviours. Reintroduced and wild-bred birds did not differ in dominance or feeding rate despite their differences in upbringing.

== Threats ==
The main cause of the rapid decline in the griffon vulture population is the consumption of poisoned baits set out by people. Wildlife conservation efforts have attempted to increase awareness of the lethal consequences of using illegally poisoned baits through education about the issue.

The Pyrenees population has apparently been affected by a European Commission ruling that due to danger of bovine spongiform encephalopathy transmission, no carcasses must be left on the fields for the time being. This has critically lowered food availability, and consequently, carrying capacity. Although the griffon vulture does not normally attack larger living prey, there are reports of Spanish griffon vultures killing weak, young or unhealthy living animals when they do not find enough carrion.
