= Gornja Trešnjica =

Gornja Trešnjica Горња Трешњица (Serbian)
- Village (Selo)
- Location within Serbia
- Coordinates: 44°07′10″N 19°29′22″E
- Country: Serbia
- Municipality: Ljubovija
- Time zone: UTC+1 (CET)
  - Summer (DST): UTC+2 (CEST)

Gornja Trešnjica (Serbian Cyrillic: Горња Трешњица) is a village in the Ljubovija municipality, Mačva District of Central Serbia. The village had a Serb ethnic majority and a population of 291 in 2002.

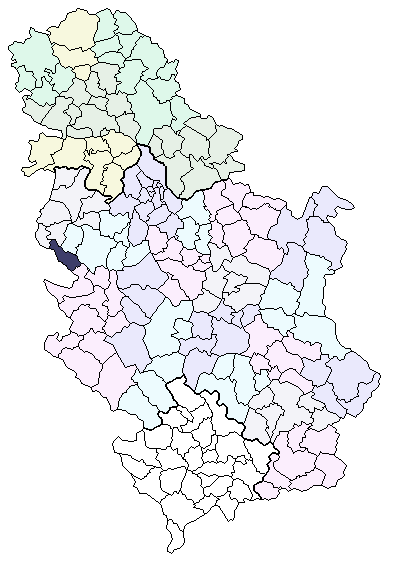
Location of the Ljubovija municipality in Serbia

== Historical population ==
- 1948: 660
- 1953: 662
- 1961: 616
- 1971: 490
- 1981: 434
- 1991: 344
- 2002: 291

== See also ==
- List of places in Serbia
