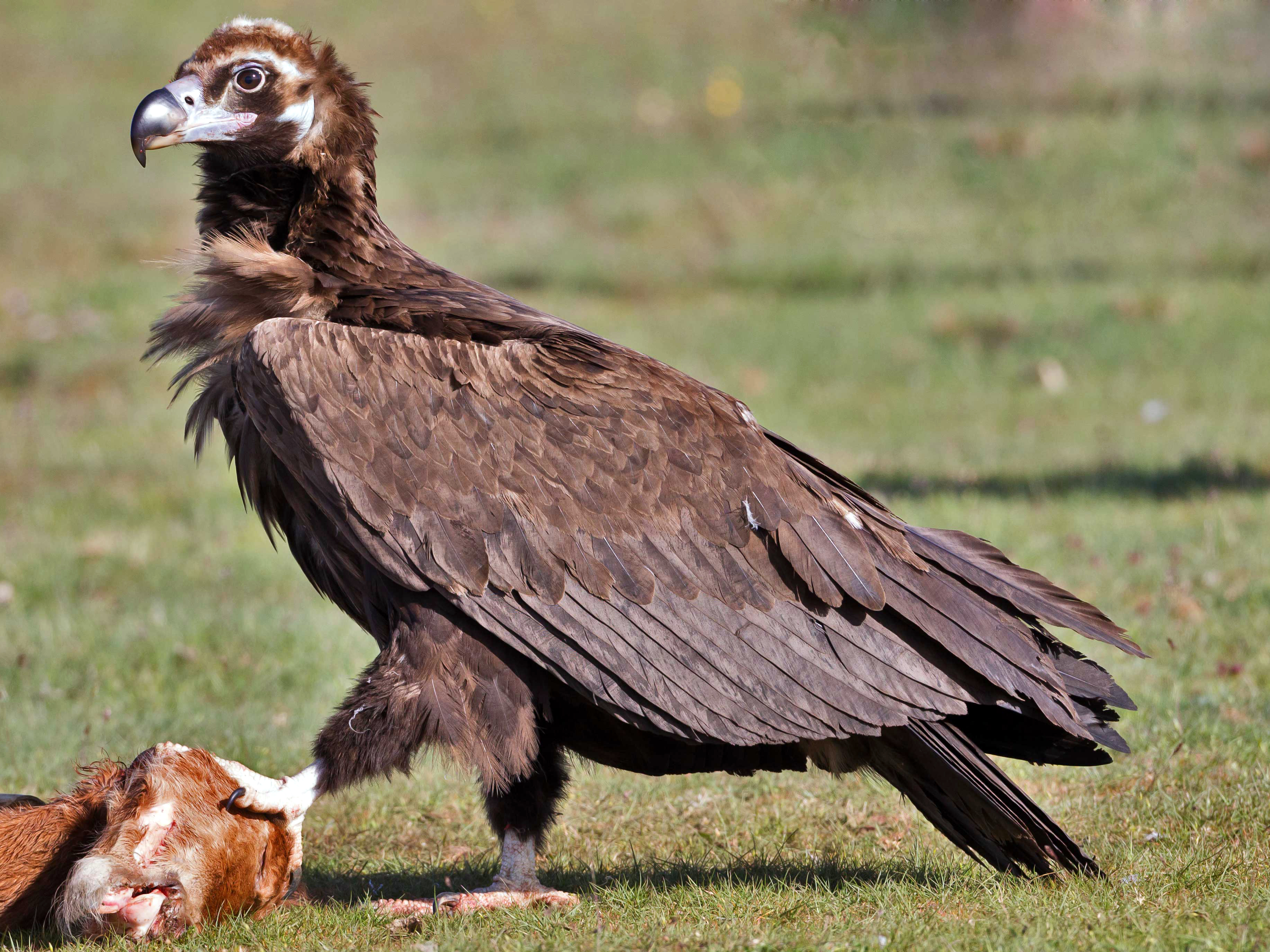

Conservation status
- Near Threatened (IUCN 3.1)

Scientific classification
- Kingdom: Animalia
- Phylum: Chordata
- Class: Aves
- Order: Accipitriformes
- Family: Accipitridae
- Genus: Aegypius
- Species: A. monachus

Binomial name
- Aegypius monachus (Linnaeus, 1766)
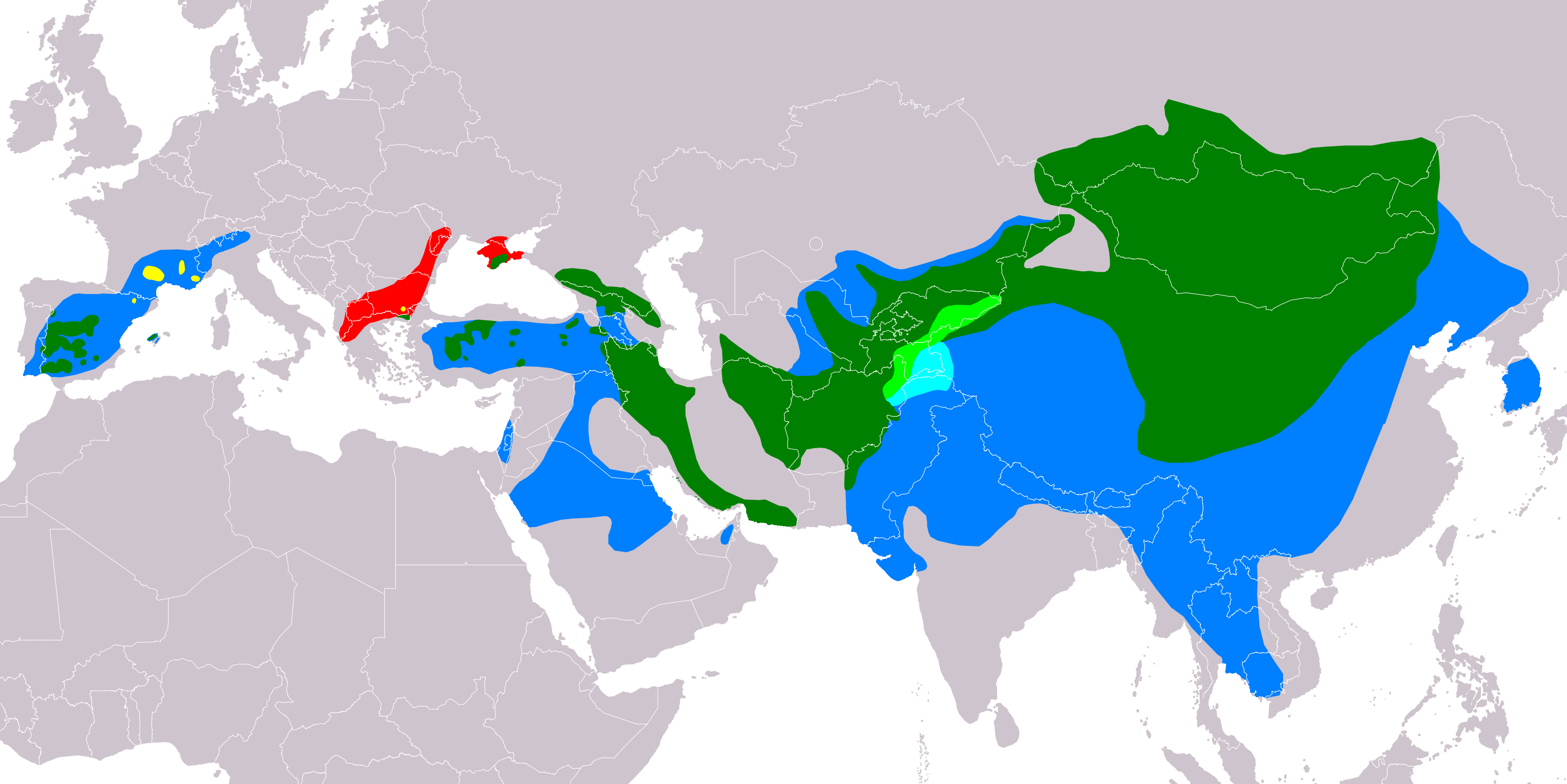
- Range of A. monachus Breeding Resident Passage Non-breeding Extinct Extant & Reintroduced (resident)

Synonyms
- Vultur monachus Linnaeus, 1766

= Cinereous vulture =

Cinereous vulture Temporal range: Miocene–present

Species of bird

The cinereous vulture (Aegypius monachus), also known as the black vulture, Eurasian black vulture, and monk vulture, is a very large raptor in the family Accipitridae distributed through much of temperate Eurasia. With a body length of 1.2 m (3 ft 11 in), 3.1 m (10 ft) across the wings and a maximum weight of 12.5 kg (28 lb), it is the largest Old World vulture and largest member of the family Accipitridae.

Aegypius monachus is one of the largest birds of prey and it plays an important role in its various ecosystems by eating carcasses, which in turn reduces the spread of diseases. The vultures are constantly exposed to many pathogens because of their eating carrion. A study of the gastric and immune defense systems conducted in 2015 sequenced the bird's entire genome. The study compared cinereous vultures to bald eagles, finding positively selected genetic variations associated with respiration and the ability of the vulture's immune defense responses and gastric acid secretion to digest carcasses.

== Taxonomy ==
The genus name Aegypius is a Greek word (αἰγυπιός) for 'vulture', or a bird not unlike one; Aelian describes the aegypius as "halfway between a vulture (gyps) and an eagle". Some authorities think this a good description of a lammergeier; others do not. Aegypius is the eponym of the species, whatever it was in ancient Greek. The English name 'black vulture' refers to the plumage colour, while the specific name monachus (monk) and 'monk vulture', a direct translation of its German name Mönchsgeier, refers to the bald head and ruff of neck feathers like a monk's cowl. The name 'cinereous vulture' (Latin cineraceus, ash-coloured; pale, whitish grey), was a deliberate attempt to rename it in order to distinguish it from the American black vulture, but has also been used historically by Francis Willughby for the pale grey juvenile of the largely white Egyptian vulture.

It is most closely related to the lappet-faced vulture, with this pair then to the white-headed vulture and the red-headed vulture; all three have sometimes been included with it in a broader interpretation of the genus Aegypius.

This bird is an Old World vulture, and as such is only distantly related to the New World vultures, which are in a separate family, Cathartidae, of the same order. It is therefore not closely related to the much smaller American black vulture (Coragyps atratus) despite the similar name and colour.

== Description ==
In Jodbeed Gadhwala Conservation Reserve, Rajasthan, India.

The cinereous vulture measures 98–120 cm (39–47 in) in total length with a 2.5–3.1 m (8 ft 2 in – 10 ft 2 in) wingspan. Males can weigh from 6.3 to 11.5 kg (14 to 25 lb), whereas females can weigh from 7.5 to 12.5 kg (17 to 28 lb). (Note: Some sources claim higher weights at 14 kg (31 lb).) It is the largest accipitrid and is thus one of the world's heaviest flying birds. Average weights were long not known to have been published for this species but the median weight figures from two sources were 9.42 kg (20.8 lb) and 9.55 kg (21.1 lb). However in a Korean study, a large survey of wild cinereous vultures was found to have weighed an average of 9.6 kg (21 lb) with a mean total length of 113 cm (44 in), this standing as the only attempt to attain the average sizes of free-flying mature birds of the species, as opposed to nestlings or captive specimens. Unlike most accipitrids, males can broadly overlap in size with the females, although not uncommonly the females may be slightly heavier. These are one of the two largest extant Old World vultures and accipitrids, with similar total length and perhaps wingspans recorded in the Himalayan vulture (Gyps himalayensis), as indicated by broadly similar wing and tail proportions, but the cinereous appears to be slightly heavier as well as slightly larger in tarsus and bill length. Superficially similar but only distantly related New World condors can either be of similar wing area and bulk or slightly larger in these aspects. Despite limited genetic variation in the species, body size increases from west to east based on standard measurements, with the birds from southwest Europe (Spain and south France) averaging about 10% smaller than the vultures from central Asia (Manchuria, Mongolia and northern China). Among standard measurements, the wing chord is 73–89 cm (29–35 in), the tail is 33–41 cm (13–16 in) and the tarsus is 12–14.6 cm (4.7–5.7 in).

The cinereous vulture is distinctly dark, with the whole body being dark blackish-brown excepting the pale head in adults, which is covered in fine blackish down. This down is absent in the closely related lappet-faced vulture (Torgos tracheliotos). The skin of the head and neck is bluish-grey and a paler whitish colour above the eye. The adult has brown eyes, a purplish cere, a blue-grey bill and pale blue-grey legs. The primary quills are often actually black. From a distance, flying birds can easily appear all black. The immature plumage is sepia-brown above, with a much paler underside than in adults. Immature cinereous vultures have grey down on the head, a pale mauve cere and grey legs. Its massive bill is one of the largest of any living accipitrid, a feature enhanced by the relatively small skull of the species. The exposed culmen measures 8–9 cm (3.1–3.5 in). Only their cousin, the lappet-faced vulture, with a bill length of up to about 10 cm (3.9 in), can rival or outsize the bill of the cinereous. The wings, with serrated leading edges, are held straight or slightly arched in flight and are broad, sometimes referred to as "barn door wings". Its flight is slow and buoyant, with deep, heavy flaps when necessary. The combination of huge size and dark colour renders it relatively distinct, especially against smaller raptors such as eagles or buzzards. The most similar-shaped species, the lappet-faced vulture (with which there might be limited range overlap in the southern Middle East), is distinguished by its bare, pinkish head and contrasting plumage. On the lappet-face, the thighs and belly are whitish in adult birds against black to brownish over the remainder of the plumage. All potential Gyps vultures are distinguished by having paler, often streaky plumage, with bulging wing primaries giving them a less evenly broad-winged form. Cinereous vultures are generally very silent, with a few querulous mewing, roaring or guttural cries solely between adults and their offspring at the nest site.

== Distribution and habitat ==
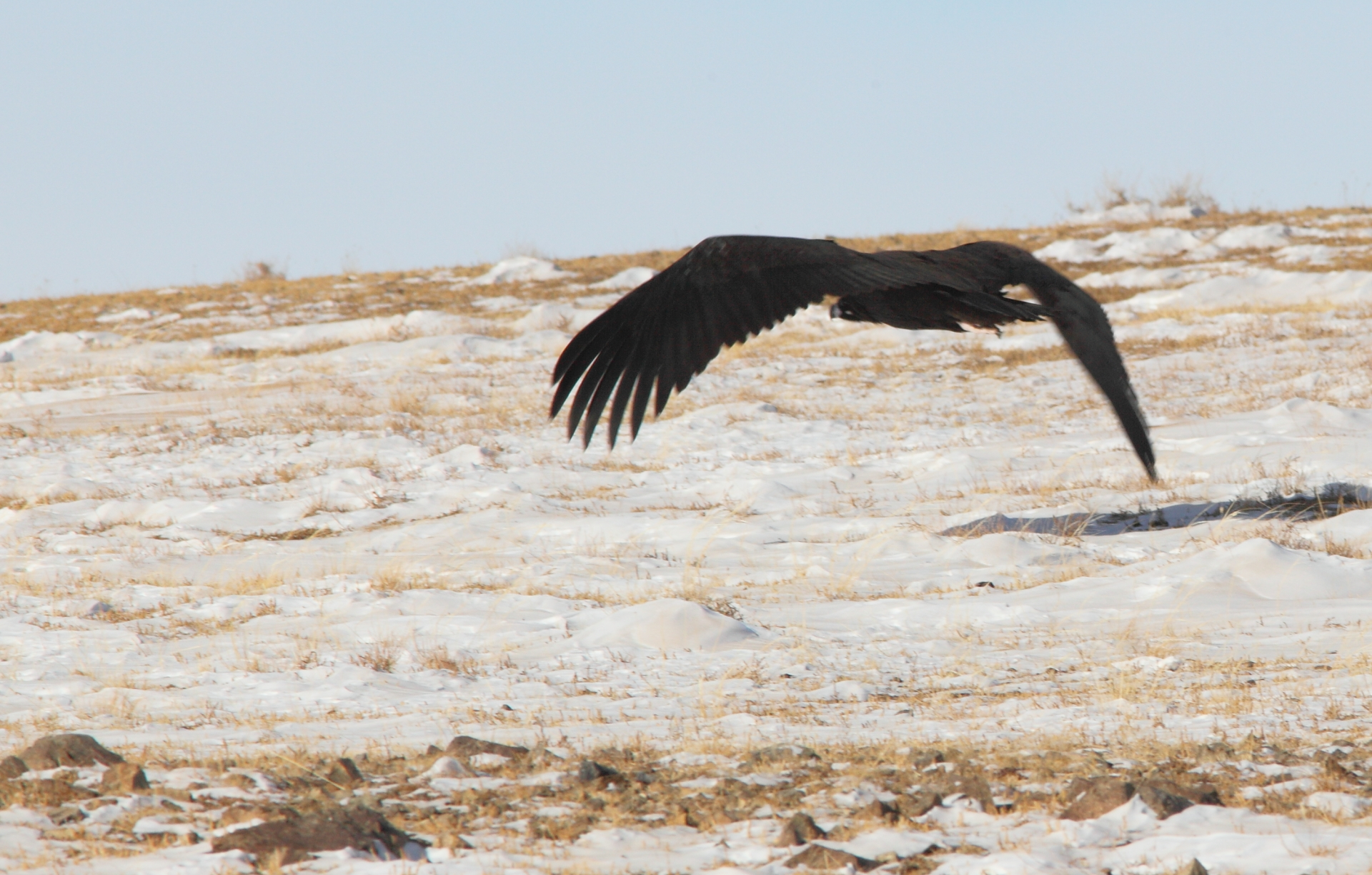
Flying over the snowy hillsides of Mongolia

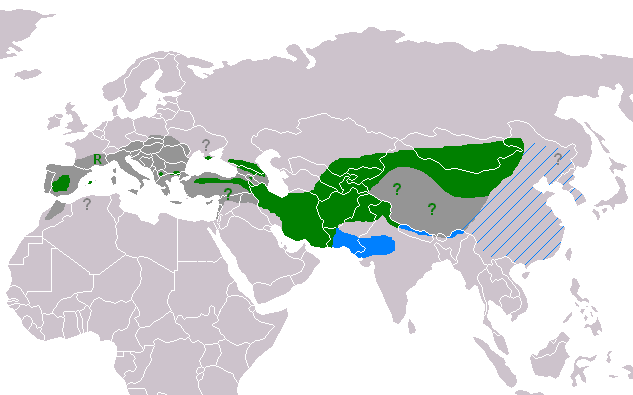
Distribution in year 2007 * Green: Current resident breeding range. * Green ?: May still breed. * Green R: Re-introduction in progress. * Blue: Winter range; rare where hatched blue. * Dark grey: Former breeding range. * Dark grey ?: Uncertain former breeding range.

The cinereous vulture is a Eurasian species. The western limits of its range are in Spain and inland Portugal, with a reintroduced population in southern France. They are found discontinuously to Greece, Turkey and throughout the central Middle East. Their range continues through Afghanistan eastwards to northern India to its eastern limits in central Asia, where they breed in northern Manchuria, Mongolia and Korea. Their range is fragmented especially throughout their European range. It is generally a permanent resident except in those parts of its range where hard winters cause limited altitudinal movement and for juveniles when they reach breeding maturity. In the eastern limits of its range, birds from the northernmost reaches may migrate down to southern Korea and China. A limited migration has also been reported in the Middle East but is not common.

This vulture is a bird of hilly, mountainous areas, especially favouring dry semi-open habitats such as meadows at high altitudes over much of the range. Nesting usually occurs near the tree line in the mountains. They are always associated with undisturbed, remote areas with limited human disturbance. They forage for carcasses over various kinds of terrain, including steppe, other grasslands, open woodlands, along riparian habitats or any kind or gradient of mountainous habitat. In their current European range and through the Caucasus and Middle East, cinereous vultures are found from 100 to 2,000 m (330 to 6,560 ft) in elevation, while in their Asian distribution, they are typically found at higher elevations. Two habitat types were found to be preferred by the species in China and Tibet. Some cinereous vultures in these areas live in mountainous forests and shrubland from 800 to 3,800 m (2,600 to 12,500 ft), while the others preferred arid or semi-arid alpine meadows and grasslands at 3,800 to 4,500 m (12,500 to 14,800 ft) in elevation. This species can fly at a very high altitude. One cinereous vulture was observed at an elevation of 6,970 m (22,870 ft) on Mount Everest. It has a specialised haemoglobin alpha^{D} subunit of high oxygen affinity which makes it possible to take up oxygen efficiently despite the low partial pressure in the upper troposphere.

== Behaviour ==
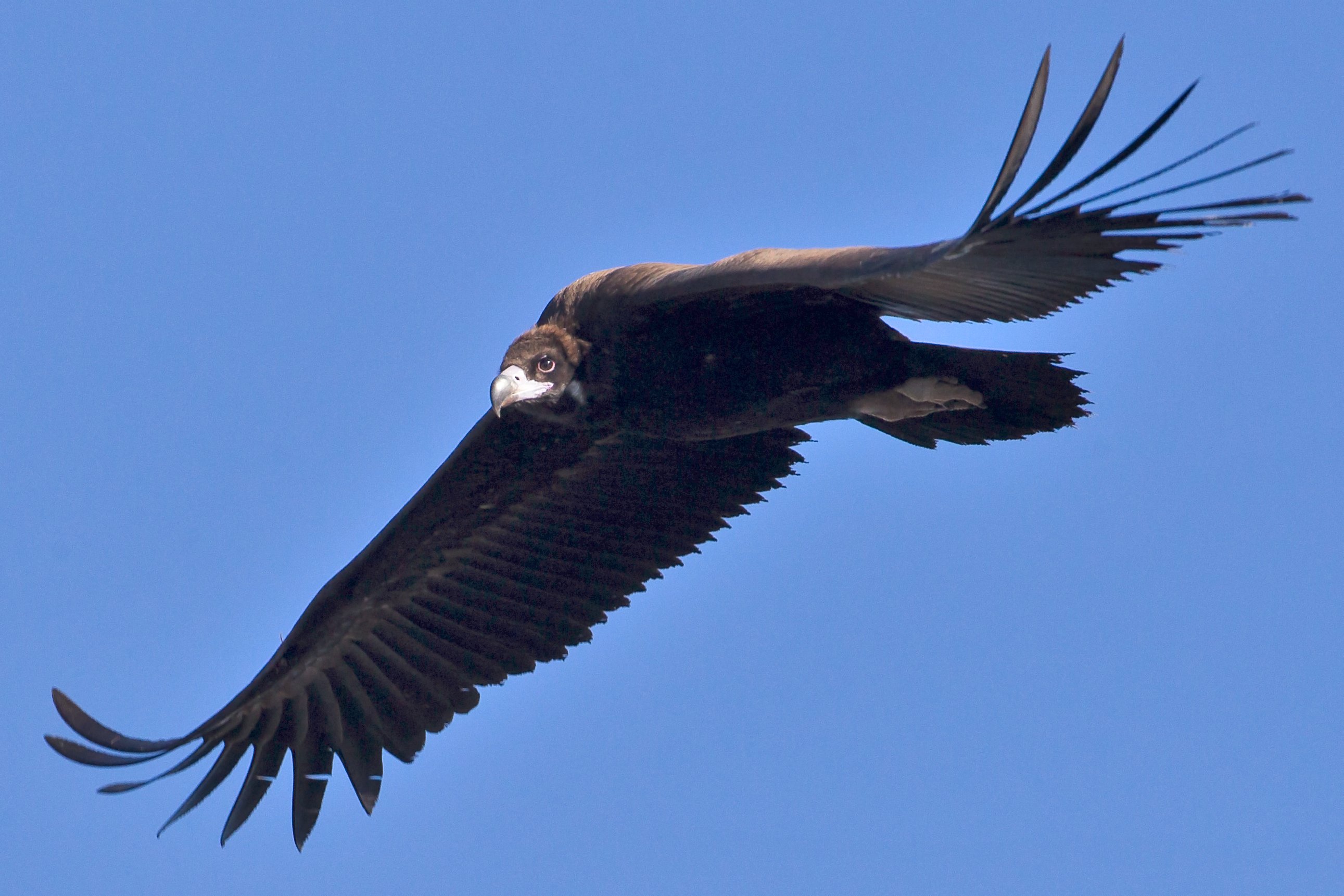
In Spain

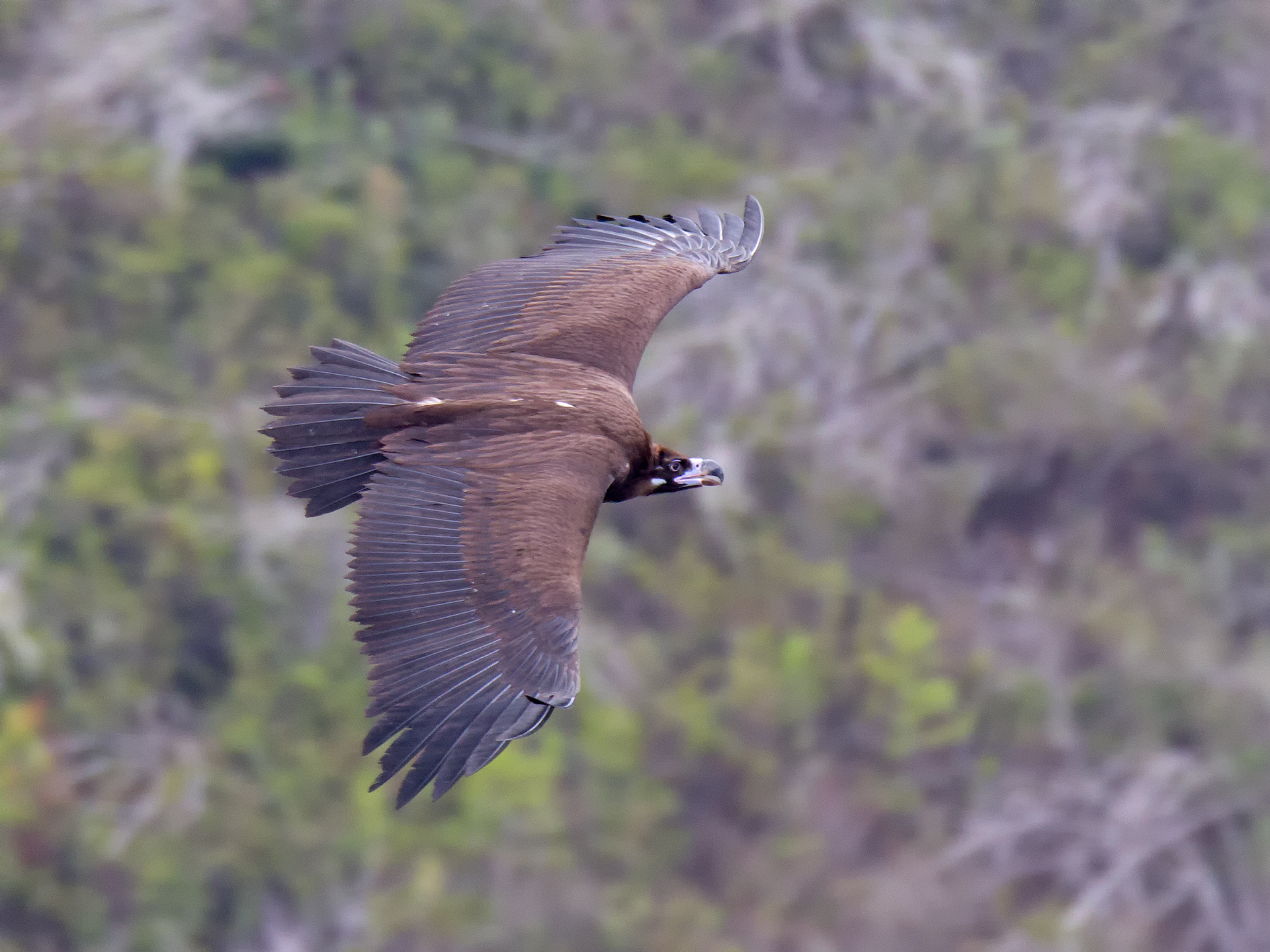
In Israel

The cinereous vulture is a largely solitary bird, being found alone or in pairs much more frequently than most other Old World vultures. At large carcasses or feeding sites, small groups may congregate. Such groups can rarely include up to 12 to 20 vultures, with some older reports of up to 30 or 40.

=== Breeding ===
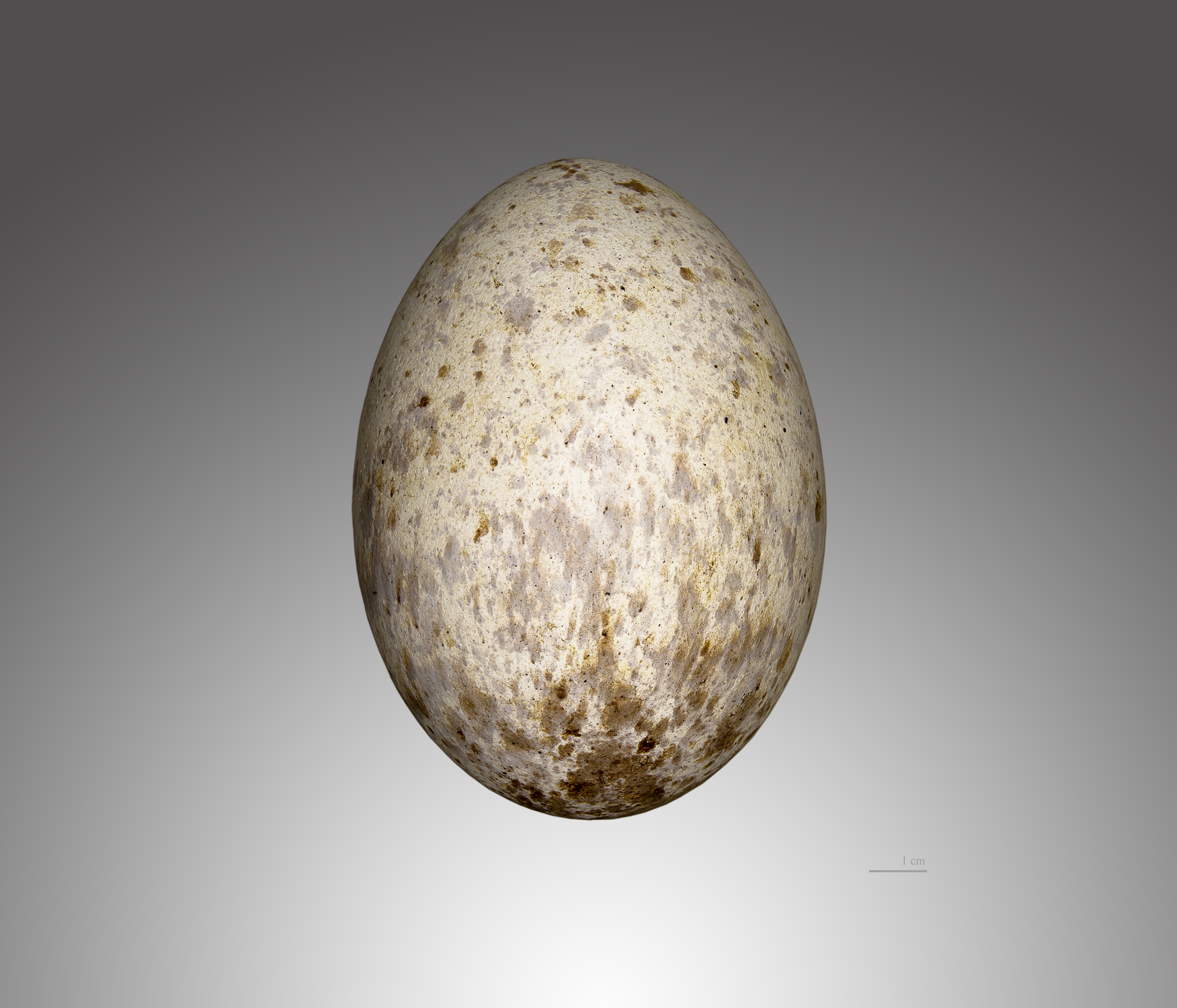
An egg

In Europe, Eurasian black vultures return to the nesting ground in January or February. In Spain and Algeria, they start nesting in February or March, in Crimea in early March, in northwestern India in February or April, in northeastern India in January, and in Turkestan in January. They breed in loose colonies, with nests rarely being found in the same tree or rock formation, unlike other Old World vultures which often nest in tight-knit colonies. In Spain, nests have been found from 300 m (980 ft) to 2 km (1.2 mi) apart from each other. The cinereous vulture breeds in high mountains and large forests, nesting in trees or occasionally on cliff ledges. The breeding season lasts from February until September or October. The most common display consists of synchronous flight movements by pairs. However, flight play between pairs and juveniles is not unusual, with the large birds interlocking talons and spiraling down through the sky. The birds use sticks and twigs as building materials, and males and females cooperate in all matters of rearing the young. The huge nest is 1.45–2 m (4 ft 9 in – 6 ft 7 in) across and 1–3 m (3 ft 3 in – 9 ft 10 in) deep. The nest increases in size as a pair uses it repeatedly over the years and often comes to be decorated with dung and animal skins. The nests can range up to 1.5 to 12 m (4 ft 11 in to 39 ft 4 in) high in a large tree such as an oak, juniper, wild pear, almond or pine trees. Most nesting trees are found along cliffs. In a few cases, cinereous vultures have been recorded as nesting directly on cliffs. One cliff nest completely filled a ledge that was 3.63 m (11.9 ft) wide and 2.5 m (8 ft 2 in) in depth. The egg clutch typically contains only a single egg, though two may be laid in rare cases. The eggs have a white or pale buff base colour are often overlaid with red, purplish or red-brown marks, being almost as spotted as the egg of a falcon. Eggs measure from 83.4 to 104 mm (3.28 to 4.09 in) in height and 58 to 75 mm (2.3 to 3.0 in) in width, with an average of 90 mm × 69.7 mm (3.54 in × 2.74 in). The incubation period ranges from 50 to 62 days, averaging 50–56 days, and hatching occurs in April or May in Europe. The young are covered in greyish-white to grey-brown down which becomes paler with age. The first flight feathers start growing from the same sockets as the down when the nestling is around 30 days old and completely cover the down by 60 days of age. The parents feed the young by regurgitation and an active nest reportedly becomes very foul and stinking. Weights of nestlings in Mongolia increased from as little as 2 kg (4.4 lb) when they are around a month old in early June to being slightly more massive than their parents at up to nearly 16 kg (35 lb) shortly before fledging in early autumn.

The nesting success is relatively high, with around 90% of eggs successfully hatching and more than half of yearling birds known to survive to adulthood. They are devoted, active parents, with both members of a breeding pair protecting the nest and feeding the young in shifts via regurgitation. In Mongolia, Pallas's cat (Otocolobus manul) and the common raven (Corvus corax) are considered potential predators of eggs in potentially both tree and cliff nests. Wolves (Canis lupus) and foxes are also mentioned as potential nest predators. There have been witnessed accounts of bearded vultures (Gypaetus barbatus) and Spanish imperial eagles (Aquila adalberti) attempting to kill nestlings, but in both cases they were chased off by the parents. There is a single case of a Spanish imperial eagle attacking and killing a cinereous vulture in an act of defense of its own nest in Spain. Golden eagles and Eurasian eagle-owls may rarely attempt to dispatch an older nestling or even adults in an ambush, but the species is not verified prey for either and it would be a rare event in all likelihood if it does occur. This species may live for up to 39 years, though 20 years or less is probably more common, with no regular predators of adults other than man.

=== Feeding ===
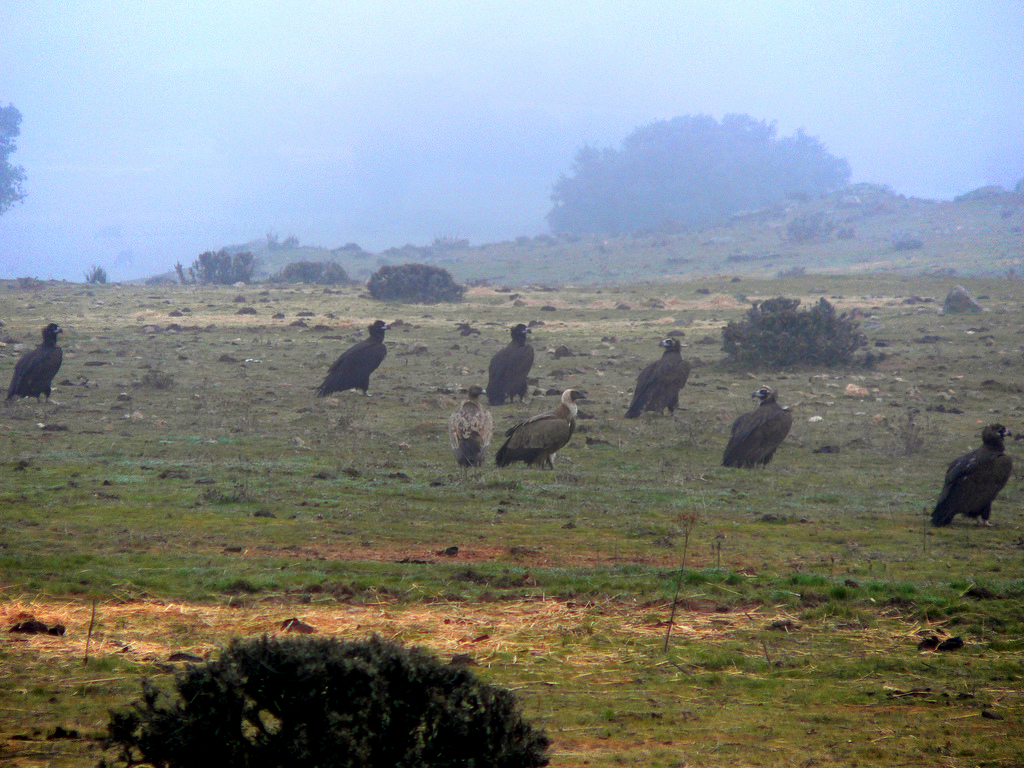
Six cinereous vultures with the smaller griffon vultures

Like all vultures, the cinereous vulture eats mostly carrion. The cinereous vulture feeds on carrion of almost any type, from the largest mammals available to fish and reptiles. In Tibet, commonly eaten carcasses can include both wild and domestic yaks (Bos mutus and Bos grunniens), bharal (Pseudois nayaur), goas (Procapra picticaudata), kiangs (Equus kiang), woolly hares (Lepus oiostolus), Himalayan marmots (Marmota himalayana), domestic sheep (Ovis aries), and even humans, mainly those at their celestial burial grounds. Reportedly in Mongolia, tarbagan marmots (Marmota sibirica) comprised the largest part of the diet, although that species is now endangered as it is preferred in the diet of local people, wild prey ranging from corsac fox (Vulpes corsac) to argali (Ovis ammon) may be eaten additionally in Mongolia. Historically, cinereous vultures in the Iberian Peninsula fed mostly on European rabbit (Oryctolagus cuniculus) carcasses, but since viral hemorrhagic pneumonia (VHP) devastated the once abundant rabbit population there, the vultures now rely on the carrion of domestic sheep, supplemented by pigs (Sus domesticus) and deer. In Turkey, the dietary preferences were argali (92 carrion items), wild boar (Sus scrofa) (53 items), chickens (Gallus gallus domesticus) (27 items), wolves (13 items) and red foxes (Vulpes vulpes) (13 items). Unusually, a large amount of plant material, especially pine cones, was found in pellets from Turkey. Among the vultures in its range, the cinereous is best equipped to tear open tough carcass skins thanks to its powerful bill. It can even break apart bones, such as ribs, to access the flesh of large animals. It is dominant over other scavengers in its range, even over other large vultures such as Gyps vultures, bearded vultures or fierce ground predators such as foxes. While the noisy Gyps vultures squawk and fly around, the often silent cinereous vultures will keep them well at bay until they are satisfied and have had their own fill. A series of photos taken recently show a cinereous vulture attacking a Himalayan vulture in flight for unknown reasons, although the target was not seriously injured. Cinereous vultures frequently bully and dominate steppe eagles (Aquila nipalensis) when the two species are attracted to the same prey and carrion while wintering in Asia. A rare successful act of kleptoparasitism on a cinereous vulture was filmed in Korea when a Steller's sea eagle (Haliaeetus pelagicus) stole food from the vulture.

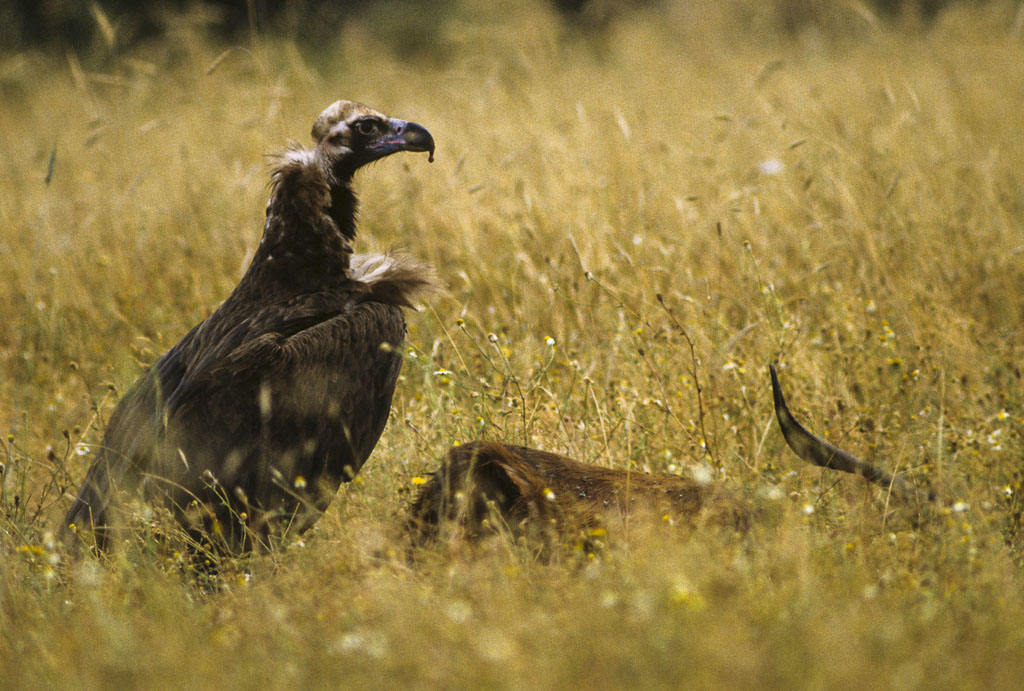
A cinereous vulture feeding in Spain

Its closest living relative is the lappet-faced vulture, which takes live prey on occasion. Occasionally, the cinereous vulture has been recorded as preying on live prey as well. Live animals reportedly taken by cinereous vultures include calves of yaks and domestic cattle (Bos taurus), piglets, domestic lambs and puppies (Canis lupus familiaris), foxes, lambs of wild sheep, together with nestling and fledglings of large birds such as geese, swans and pheasants, various rodents and rarely amphibians and reptiles. This species has hunted tortoises (which the vultures are likely to kill by carrying in flight and dropping on rocks to penetrate the shell; cf. Aeschylus#Death) and lizards. Although rarely observed in the act of killing ungulates, cinereous vultures have been recorded as flying low around herds and feeding on recently killed wild ungulates they are believed to have killed. Mainly neonatal lambs or calves are hunted, especially sickly ones. Although not normally thought to be a threat to healthy domestic lambs, rare predation on apparently healthy lambs has been confirmed. Species believed to be hunted by cinereous vultures have included argali, saiga antelope (Saiga tatarica), Mongolian gazelle (Procapra gutturosa) and Tibetan antelope (Pantholops hodgsonii).

== Status and conservation ==
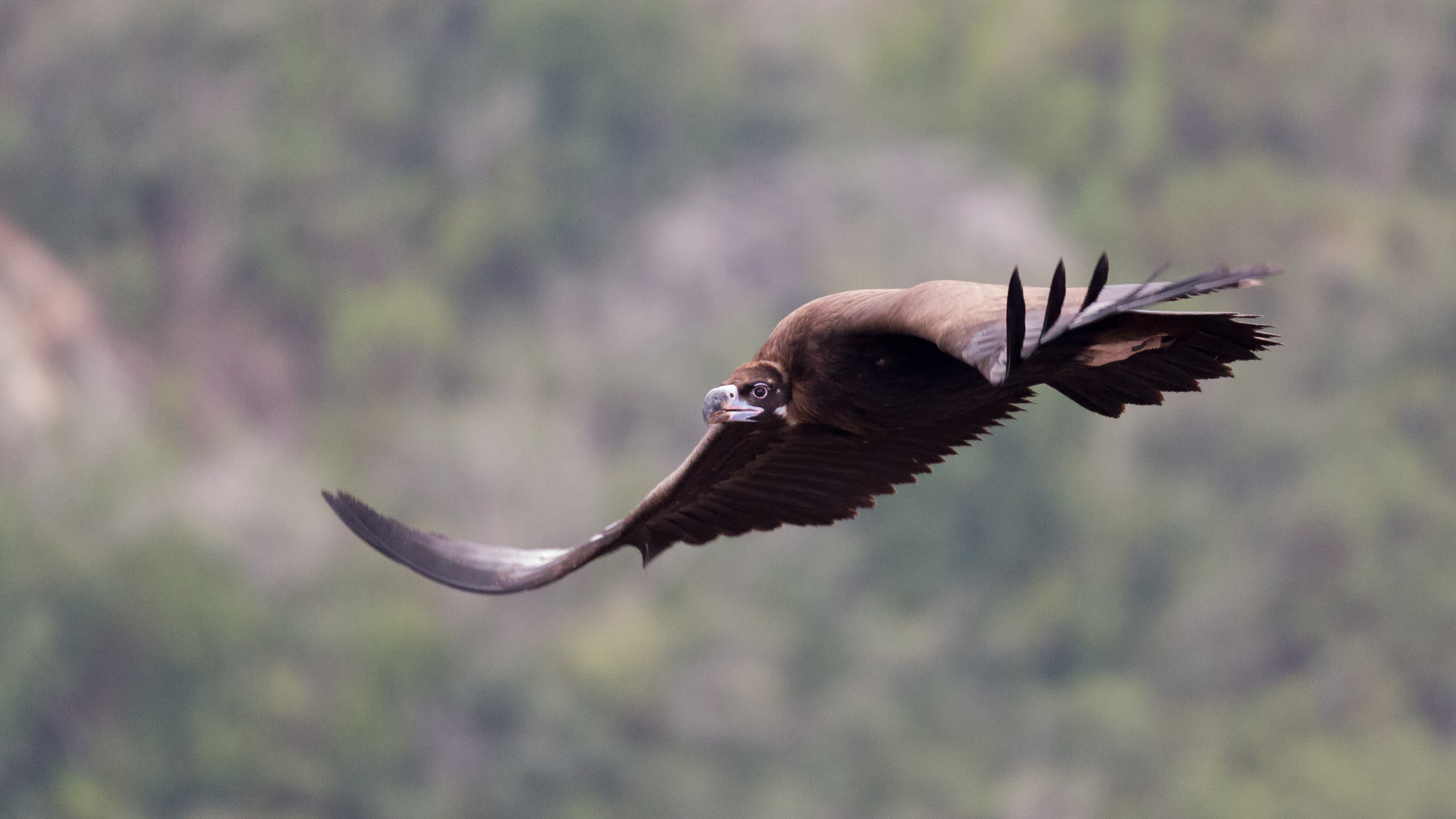
A cinereous vulture flying over Mount Carmel on a rare visit in Israel (2016)

A cinereous vulture in Bird Paradise, Singapore

The cinereous vulture has declined over most of its range in the last 200 years in part due to poisoning by eating poisoned bait put out to kill dogs and other predators, and to higher hygiene standards reducing the amount of available carrion; it is currently listed as Near Threatened. Vultures of all species, although not the target of poisoning operations, may be shot on sight by locals. Trapping and hunting of cinereous vultures is particularly prevalent in China and Russia, although the poaching for trophy hunting are also known for Armenia, and probably other countries in Caucasus. Perhaps an even greater threat to this desolation-loving species is development and habitat destruction. Nests, often fairly low in the main fork of a tree, are relatively easy to access and thus have been historically compromised by egg and firewood collectors regularly. The decline has been the greatest in the western half of the range, with extinction in many European countries (France, Italy, Austria, Poland, Slovakia, Albania, Moldova, Romania) and its entire breeding range in northwest Africa (Morocco and Algeria). They no longer nest in Israel. Turkey holds the second largest population of this species in the Western Palearctic. Despite the recent demographic bottleneck, this population has maintained moderate levels of genetic diversity, with no significant genetic structuring indicating that this is a single meta-population connected by frequent dispersal. More recently, protection and deliberate feeding schemes have allowed some local recoveries in numbers, particularly in Spain, where numbers increased to about 1,000 pairs by 1992 after an earlier decline to 200 pairs in 1970. This colony have now spread its breeding grounds to Portugal. Elsewhere in Europe, very small but increasing numbers breed in Bulgaria and Greece, and a re-introduction scheme is under way in France. Trends in the small populations in Ukraine (Crimea) and European Russia, and in Asian populations, are not well recorded. In the former USSR, it is still threatened by illegal capture for zoos, and in Tibet by rodenticides. It is a regular winter visitor around the coastal areas of Pakistan in small numbers. The worldwide population of cinereous vultures was estimated at 4,500–5,000 individuals at the turn of the 21st century.

The most recent global population estimate for Cinereous Vulture (according to Bird Life International (2017)) is 7,800–10,500 pairs, roughly equating to 15,600–21,000 mature individuals. This consists of 2,300–2,500 pairs in Europe (2004) and 5,500–8,000 pairs in Asia.

== Culture and mythology ==
The Hebrew word for "eagle" is also used for the cinereous vulture. As such, Biblical passages alluding to eagles might actually be referring to this or other vultures.
