= 2024 in archosaur paleontology =

This article records new taxa of every kind of fossil archosaur that are scheduled to be described during 2024, as well as other significant discoveries and events related to the paleontology of archosaurs published in 2024.

== Pseudosuchians ==
=== New pseudosuchian taxa ===
Name	Novelty	Status	Authors	Age	Type locality	Country	Notes	Images
Ahdeskatanka	Gen. et sp. nov		Cossette & Tarailo	Wasatchian	Golden Valley Formation	United States (North Dakota)	A member of the family Alligatoridae belonging to the subfamily Alligatorinae. The type species is A. russlanddeutsche.	
Aphaurosuchus kaiju	Sp. nov	Valid	Martins et al.	Late Cretaceous	Adamantina Formation	Brazil	A baurusuchid. Announced in 2023; the final article version was published in 2024.	
Araripesuchus manzanensis	Sp. nov	Valid	Fernández Dumont et al.	Late Cretaceous (Cenomanian)	Candeleros Formation	Argentina		
Asiatosuchus oenotriensis	Sp. nov		Narváez et al.	Eocene (Lutetian)		Spain	A basal member of Crocodyloidea.	
Benggwigwishingasuchus	Gen. et sp. nov	Valid	Smith et al.	Middle Triassic (Anisian)	Favret Formation	United States (Nevada)	A member of Paracrocodylomorpha, probably belonging to the group Poposauroidea. The type species is B. eremicarminis.	Benggwigwishingasuchus
Caipirasuchus catanduvensis	Sp. nov		Iori et al.	Late Cretaceous	Adamantina Formation	Brazil		
Enalioetes	Gen. et sp. nov	Valid	Sachs et al.	Early Cretaceous (Valanginian)	Stadthagen Formation	Germany	A metriorhynchid. The type species is E. schroederi.	
Epoidesuchus	Gen. et sp. nov		Ruiz et al.	Late Cretaceous (Campanian–Maastrichtian)	Adamantina Formation	Brazil	A itasuchid notosuchian. The type species is E. tavaresae.	
Garzapelta	Gen. et sp. nov	Valid	Reyes, Martz & Small	Late Triassic (Norian)	Cooper Canyon Formation	United States (Texas)	An aetosaur. The type species is G. muelleri.	
Ophiussasuchus	Gen. et sp. nov	Valid	López-Rojas et al.	Late Jurassic (Kimmeridgian–Tithonian)	Lourinhã Formation	Portugal	A goniopholidid crocodylomorph. The type species is O. paimogonectes.	
Paranacaiman	Gen. et sp. nov		Bona et al.	Miocene	Ituzaingó Formation	Argentina	A caiman. The type species is P. bravardi. Fossils of this genus were previously referred to Caiman lutescens.	
Paranasuchus	Gen. et comb. nov		Bona et al.	Miocene	Ituzaingó Formation	Argentina	A caiman. The type species is "Caiman" gasparinae.	
Parvosuchus	Gen. et sp. nov		Müller	Triassic (Ladinian–Carnian)	Pinheiros-Chiniquá Sequence of the Santa Maria Supersequence	Brazil	A gracilisuchid pseudosuchian. The type species is P. aurelioi.	
Schultzsuchus	Gen. et comb. nov		Desojo & Rauhut	Triassic (Ladinian–Carnian)	Pinheiros-Chiniquá Sequence of the Santa Maria Supersequence	Brazil	A member of Paracrocodylomorpha, probably belonging to the group Poposauroidea. The type species is "Prestosuchus" loricatus von Huene (1938).	
Sutekhsuchus	Gen. et comb. nov	Valid	Burke et al.	Miocene	Moghra Formation	Egypt; Libya	A member of the family Gavialidae belonging to the subfamily Gavialinae. The type species is "Tomistoma" dowsoni Fourtau (1920).	
Varanosuchus	Gen et sp. nov	Valid	Pochat-Cottilloux et al.	Early Cretaceous	Sao Khua Formation	Thailand	An atoposaurid. The type species is V. sakonnakhonensis.	

=== General pseudosuchian research ===
- Evidence of the impact of function on the evolution of the lower jaw morphology in crocodile-line archosaurs is presented by Rawson et al. (2024).
- A review of studies on the thermometabolism of crocodile-line archosaurs from the preceding 20 years is published by Faure-Brac (2024).
- Sennikov (2024) interprets ornithosuchids as macrophagous predators with specialized jaw apparatus, and notes analogs between them and saber-toothed therapsids (including mammals).
- A study on the locomotion of Riojasuchus tenuisceps is published by von Baczko et al. (2024), who reconstruct R. tenuisceps as having an erect posture and parasagittal gait, but do not conclusively resolve whether it was bipedal or quadrupedal.
- A study on the anatomy of the skull and on the neurology of Tarjadia ruthae is published by Desojo et al. (2024).
- A study on the humeral bone histology of Benggwigwishingasuchus eremacarminis is published by Klein (2024), who finds no evidence of secondary aquatic adaptations, but reports evidence indicative a slower growth rate than in Effigia and Sillosuchus.
- Redescription of the skeletal anatomy of Shuvosaurus inexpectatus is published by Nesbitt & Chatterjee (2024).
- Mastrantonio et al. (2024) describe the anatomy of the postcranial skeleton of the most complete specimen of Prestosuchus chiniquensis reported to date, and revise the diagnosis for P. chiniquensis.
- A study on growth patterns of Prestosuchus chiniquensis, as indicated by microstructure of bone tissues of three specimens, is published by Farias et al. (2024).
- Ponce, Cerda & Desojo (2024) describe partial fibula of Aetosauroides scagliai from the Ischigualasto Formation and partial tibia of Tarjadia ruthae from the Chañares Formation diagnosed as affected by periostitis, representing the first records of periostitis in non-crocodylomorph pseudosuchians reported to date.

=== Aetosaur research ===
- Parker et al. (2024) study the anatomy and bone histology of a specimen of Coahomasuchus kahleorum from the Triassic Dockum Group (Texas, United States), providing evidence that the studied specimen is not a juvenile form of another known aetosaur, and providing new information on the anatomy of C. kahleorum.

=== Crocodylomorph research ===
- Review of adaptations of crocodylomorphs to lifestyles other than semiaquatic (i.e. terrestrial or fully aquatic) throughout their evolutionary history is published by Pochat-Cottilloux (2024).
- Pochat-Cottilloux et al. (2024) report evidence indicating that shape variation of endosseous labyrinths of extant crocodylians is affected by allometry to a greater degree than by phylogenetic relationships of the studied crocodylians, and interpret these results as indicative of problems with inclusion of fossil forms in the studies of the impact of ecology on the evolution of crocodylomorph endosseous labyrinths.
- Description of the anatomy and bone histology of the postcranial skeleton of Terrestrisuchus gracilis is published by Spiekman, Butler & Maidment.
- A study on the bone histology and growth patterns of Orthosuchus stormbergi is published by Weiss et al. (2024).
- Woodward et al. (2024) note correlation between alligator femur volume and body mass, and use femur volume to determine body mass of goniopholidids, dyrosaurs, notosuchians and thalattosuchians.
- A study on the morphological diversity of the pelvic girdle of thalattosuchians and dyrosaurids throughout their evolutionary history is published by Scavezzoni et al. (2024).
- A study on the anatomy and evolution of the pectoral girdles of thalattosuchians and dyrosaurids, an on the implications of the postcranial anatomy of crocodylomorphs for the studies of their phylogenetic relationships, is published by Scavezzoni et al. (2024).
- Young et al. (2024) provide higher level systematization for Thalattosuchia under both the PhyloCode and the International Code of Zoological Nomenclature, naming new taxa Neothalattosuchia, Euthalattosuchia and Dakosaurina.
- A study on the morphology of osteoderms of Indosinosuchus and an unnamed member of Mesoeucrocodylia from the Late Jurassic Phu Noi excavation site (Thailand) is published by Bhuttarach et al. (2024).
- A study on the bone microstructure of Macrospondylus bollensis is published by Johnson et al. (2024), who report evidence of growth at a regular rate until the animal reached adult size, of bone compactness values within the range of those of modern crocodilians, and of an amphibious lifestyle of M. bollensis, while retaining the ability to move on land.
- Weryński et al. (2024) identify a teleosauroid rostrum from the Częstochowa Sponge Limestone Formation (Poland) as belonging to a non-machimosaurin machimosaurid feeding on large prey, with morphological similarities to Neosteneosaurus edwardsi and Proexochokefalos heberti, providing evidence that such teleosauroids were present outside of Western Europe during the Oxfordian.
- Scheyer et al. (2024) describe teleosauroid tooth crowns associated with ichthyosaur remains (with scavenging traces also produced by a teleosauroid) from the Bajocian Hauptrogenstein Formation (Switzerland), representing the oldest fossil material of a member of the tribe Machimosaurini reported to date.
- Cubo et al. (2024) interpret Pelagosaurus typus as an amphibious thalattosuchian likely able to wander over land, with high resting metabolic rate compared to extant ectotherms but unlikely to be an endotherm, and interpret its hunting behavior as likely involving slow sustained swimming and rapid sideways movements of the head to capture prey.
- A study on the endocranial anatomy of Thalattosuchus superciliosus, providing evidence of anatomical differences between geosaurine and non-geosaurine metriorhynchids, is published by Higgins et al. (2024), who argue that geosaurines and metriorhynchines likely underwent parallel shifts to a pursuit predator ecomorphology throughout their evolutionary histories.
- The first fossil material of a member or a relative of the genus Plesiosuchus from France reported to date is described from the Kimmeridgian strata of the Argiles d'Ecqueville formation in Normandy by Hua (2024).
- Hua, Liston & Tabouelle (2024) describe a specimen of Metriorhynchus cf. superciliosus from the Callovian strata from the "Vaches Noires" cliffs of Villers-sur-Mer (France), preserved with gastric contents that include remains of the gill apparatus of Leedsichthys, and interpret the studied specimen as providing evidence of Metriorhynchus scavenging on the remains of Leedsichthys.
- Young et al. (2024) study the evolution of the paratympanic and paranasal sinuses in Crocodylomorpha (with a focus on thalattosuchians), and argue that the expansive snout sinus system of metriorhynchids likely prevented them from deep diving.
- Leardi et al. (2024) review the phylogenetic nomenclature of Notosuchia, define notosuchian clades according to the PhyloCode standards and name a new clade Peirosauria.
- A study on the bone histology of Araripesuchus buitreraensis, providing evidence of generally slow, annually interrupted growth rate, is published by Navarro et al. (2024).
- Fernández-Dumont (2024) describes juvenile specimens of Araripesuchus from the La Buitrera Paleontological Area (Argentina) and provides a list of characters indicating ontogenetic status of specimens of Araripesuchus.
- Evidence of a continuous and coordinated tooth replacement in Armadillosuchus arrudai, ensuring that the animal would not lose too many teeth simultaneously and that its feeding abilities were not affected by tooth loss, is presented by Borsoni, Carvalho & Marinho (2024).
- Dos Santos et al. (2024) describe the skeletal anatomy of the most complete juvenile baurusuchid specimen reported to date, and report evidence of differences in skull ornamentation and muscle development between juvenile and adult baurusuchid specimens which might be indicative of ontogenetic niche partitioning.
- A study on tooth replacement patterns in members of the genus Caipirasuchus is published by Borsoni & Carvalho (2024).
- Redescription of the skull anatomy and a study on the phylogenetic affinities of Barreirosuchus franciscoi is published by Fachini et al. (2024).
- Fossil material of a goniopholidid, interpreted as a basal form that shared several anatomical traits with derived members of the group, is described from the Lower Cretaceous Kitadani Formation (Japan) by Obuse & Shibata (2024).
- Forêt et al. (2024) study factors driving tethysuchian evolution, reporting evidence of a turnover after the Cenomanian-Turonian boundary event when a dyrosaurid-dominated fauna replaced a pholidosaurid-dominated one, of increased tethysuchian biodiversity after the Cretaceous–Paleogene extinction event, and of a positive correlation between body length and temperature.
- Fossil material of an early-diverging, long-snouted dyrosaurid is described from the Campanian Quseir Formation (Egypt) by Saber et al. (2024).
- Jouve & Rodríguez-Jiménez (2024) describe a dyrosaurid vertebra from the Thanetian Cuervos Formation (Colombia), providing evidence of survival of dyrosaurids in South America until the end of the Paleocene.
- Kuzmin et al. (2024) present the reconstruction of the Kansajsuchus extensus and note the presence of significant differences in the braincase structure of pholidosaurids and dyrosaurids, questioning the close affinity of the two groups.
- Redescription of the anatomy of the skull of Acynodon adriaticus is published by Muscioni et al. (2024).
- Rocchi & Vila (2024) describe fossil material of Allodaposuchus cf. subjuniperus from the lower Maastrichtian deposits of the Suterranya-Mina de lignit locality (La Posa Formation; Lleida, Spain), providing evidence of the presence of a third early Maastrichtian species of Allodaposuchus (in addition to A. palustris and A. hulki) in the Tremp Group.
- Yates & Stein (2024) interpret Ultrastenos willisi and "Baru" huberi as synonymous, but maintain Ultrastenos as a distinct mekosuchine genus, resulting in a new combination Ultrastenos huberi.
- Purported sebecosuchian teeth from the Pliocene Otibanda Formation (Papua New Guinea) are reinterpreted as more likely to be mekosuchine teeth by Ristevski, Molnar & Yates (2024).
- Review of the fossil record and osmoregulation of members of Alligatoroidea is published by Stout (2024), who argues that fossil members of the group might have been salt-tolerant and more ocean-going than extant alligatoroids.
- Redescription of Arambourgia gaudryi is published by Conedera et al. (2024), who recover A. gaudryi as an alligatorine, and interpret it as a semi-terrestrial animal.
- Paiva et al. (2024) reconstruct ancestral body sizes across the evolutionary history of caimanines, and interpret evolution of large body sizes in the lineages including Mourasuchus and Purussaurus as related to warmer climatic conditions with less seasonal temperature variation in the western Amazonian region of South America during the Miocene.
- A study on the skull anatomy of Eosuchus lerichei is published by Burke et al. (2024), who report possible evidence of the presence of salt glands, and interpret Eosuchus as a gavialoid that wasn't closely related to "thoracosaurs".
- Redescription of Crocodylus palaeindicus and a study on the phylogenetic relationships of members of Crocodyloidea is published by Chabrol et al. (2024), who consider Crocodylus sivalensis to be a junior synonym of C. palaeindicus, find evidence of a close relationship of Crocodylus checchiai and Crocodylus falconensis with extant American crocodiles, recover Kinyang as a crocodyline rather than osteolaemine, recover Albertosuchus knudsenii, Prodiplocynodon langi and "Crocodylus" affinis outside Crocodyloidea, and consider an alligatoroid placement for the clade Orientalosuchina to be highly labile.

== Non-avian dinosaurs ==
=== New dinosaur taxa ===
Name	Novelty	Status	Authors	Age	Type locality	Country	Notes	Images
Allosaurus anax	Sp. nov	Valid	Danison et al.	Late Jurassic (Kimmeridgian)	Morrison Formation	United States (Oklahoma)	An allosauroid theropod; a species of Allosaurus.	
Alpkarakush	Gen. et sp. nov	Valid	Rauhut et al.	Middle Jurassic (Callovian)	Balabansai Formation	Kyrgyzstan	A metriacanthosaurid theropod. The type species is A. kyrgyzicus.	
Archaeocursor	Gen. et sp. nov	Valid	Yao et al.	Early Jurassic (Sinemurian–Pliensbachian)	Ziliujing Formation	China	A basal ornithischian. The type species is A. asiaticus. Announced in 2024; the final article version was published in 2025.	
Ardetosaurus	Gen. et sp. nov	Valid	van der Linden et al.	Late Jurassic (Kimmeridgian)	Morrison Formation	United States (Wyoming)	A diplodocine sauropod. The type species is A. viator.	
Asiatyrannus	Gen. et sp. nov	Disputed	Zheng et al.	Late Cretaceous (Maastrichtian)	Nanxiong Formation	China	A tyrannosaurine theropod. The type species is A. xui. Argued to be likely a junior synonym of Tarbosaurus bataar by Raun et al. (2026).	
Baiyinosaurus	Gen. et sp. nov	Valid	Ning et al.	Middle Jurassic (Bathonian)	Wangjiashan Formation	China	A basal stegosaurian. The type species is B. baojiensis.	
Caletodraco	Gen. et sp. nov	Valid	Buffetaut et al.	Late Cretaceous (Cenomanian)	Chalk of the Pays de Caux	France	An abelisaurid theropod. The type species is C. cottardi.	
Campananeyen	Gen. et sp. nov	Valid	Lerzo et al.	Late Cretaceous (Cenomanian)	Candeleros Formation	Argentina	A rebbachisaurid sauropod. The type species is C. fragilissimus.	
Chakisaurus	Gen. et sp. nov	Valid	Alvarez Nogueira et al.	Late Cretaceous (Cenomanian–Turonian)	Huincul Formation	Argentina	An elasmarian ornithopod. The type species is C. nekul.	
Coahuilasaurus	Gen. et sp. nov	Valid	Longrich et al.	Late Cretaceous (Campanian)	Cerro del Pueblo Formation	Mexico	A saurolophine hadrosaurid belonging to the tribe Kritosaurini. The type species is C. lipani.	
Comptonatus	Gen. et sp. nov	Valid	Lockwood et al.	Early Cretaceous (Barremian)	Wessex Formation	United Kingdom	An hadrosauriform ornithopod. The type species is C. chasei.	
Datai	Gen. et sp. nov	Valid	Xing et al.	Late Cretaceous (Turonian–Early Coniacian)	Zhoutian Formation	China	An ankylosaurid. The type species is D. yingliangis.	
Diuqin	Gen. et sp. nov	Valid	Porfiri et al.	Late Cretaceous (Santonian)	Bajo de la Carpa Formation	Argentina	An unenlagiine theropod. The type species is D. lechiguanae.	
Dornraptor	Gen. et sp. nov	Valid	Baron	Early Jurassic (Hettangian–Sinemurian)	Blue Lias Formation	United Kingdom	An averostran theropod. The type species is D. normani.	
Emiliasaura	Gen. et sp. nov	Valid	Coria et al.	Early Cretaceous (Valanginian)	Mulichinco Formation	Argentina	An ornithopod belonging to the group Rhabdodontomorpha. The type species is E. alessandrii. Announced in 2024; the final article version was published in 2025.	
Eoneophron	Gen. et sp. nov	Valid	Atkins-Weltman et al.	Late Cretaceous (Maastrichtian)	Hell Creek Formation	United States (South Dakota)	A caenagnathid theropod. The type species is E. infernalis.	
Fona	Gen. et sp. nov	Valid	Avrahami et al.	Late Cretaceous (Cenomanian)	Cedar Mountain Formation	United States (Utah)	A thescelosaurid ornithischian. The type species is F. herzogae.	
Gandititan	Gen. et sp. nov	Valid	Han et al.	Late Cretaceous (Cenomanian–Turonian)	Zhoutian Formation	China	A titanosaur sauropod. The type species is G. cavocaudatus.	
Harenadraco	Gen. et sp. nov	Valid	Lee et al.	Late Cretaceous	Barun Goyot Formation	Mongolia	A troodontid theropod. The type species is H. prima.	
Hesperonyx	Gen. et sp. nov	Valid	Rotatori et al.	Late Jurassic	Lourinhã Formation	Portugal	An early diverging iguanodontian ornithopod, possibly a dryomorphan. The type species is H. martinhotomasorum.	
Huaxiazhoulong	Gen. et sp. nov	Valid	Zhu et al.	Late Cretaceous (Campanian)	Tangbian Formation	China	An ankylosaurid. The type species is H. shouwen.	
Hypnovenator	Gen. et sp. nov	Valid	Kubota, Kobayashi & Ikeda	Early Cretaceous (Albian)	Ohyamashimo Formation	Japan	A troodontid theropod. The type species is H. matsubaraetoheorum.	
Inawentu	Gen. et sp. nov	Valid	Filippi et al.	Late Cretaceous (Santonian)	Bajo de la Carpa Formation	Argentina	A titanosaur sauropod. The type species is I. oslatus. Announced in 2023; the final article version was published in 2024.	
Jingiella	Gen. et sp. nov	Valid	Ren et al.	Late Jurassic	Dongxing Formation	China	A mamenchisaurid sauropod. The type species is J. dongxingensis. The initially proposed name is preoccupied by Jingia Chen, 1983. The replacement name was published in an addendum.	
Kiyacursor	Gen. et sp. nov		Averianov et al.	Early Cretaceous (Aptian)	Ilek Formation	Russia (Kemerovo Oblast)	A noasaurid theropod. The type species is K. longipes.	
Koleken	Gen. et sp. nov	Valid	Pol et al.	Late Cretaceous (Campanian–Maastrichtian)	La Colonia Formation	Argentina	An abelisaurid theropod. The type species is K. inakayali.	
Labocania aguillonae	Sp. nov	Valid	Rivera-Sylva & Longrich	Late Cretaceous (Campanian)	Cerro del Pueblo Formation	Mexico	A teratophonein tyrannosaurine; a species of Labocania.	
Lishulong	Gen. et sp. nov	Valid	Zhang et al.	Early Jurassic (Sinemurian–Toarcian)	Lufeng Formation	China	An early member of Sauropodiformes. The type species is L. wangi.	
Lokiceratops	Gen. et sp. nov	Valid	Loewen et al.	Late Cretaceous (Campanian)	Judith River Formation	United States (Montana)	A centrosaurine ceratopsian. The type species is L. rangiformis.	
Minqaria	Gen. et sp. nov	Valid	Longrich et al.	Late Cretaceous (Maastrichtian)	Ouled Abdoun Basin	Morocco	A lambeosaurine hadrosaurid belonging to the tribe Arenysaurini. The type species is M. bata.	
Musankwa	Gen. et sp. nov	Valid	Barrett et al.	Late Triassic (Norian)	Pebbly Arkose Formation	Zimbabwe	A massopodan sauropodomorph. The type species is M. sanyatiensis.	
Qianjiangsaurus	Gen. et sp. nov	Valid	Dai et al.	Late Cretaceous	Zhengyang Formation	China	An early-diverging hadrosauromorph. The type species is Q. changshengi. Announced in 2024; the final article version was published in 2025.	
Qunkasaura	Gen. et sp. nov	Valid	Mocho et al.	Late Cretaceous (Campanian-Maastrichtian)	Villalba de la Sierra Formation	Spain	A saltasauroid titanosaur. The type species is Q. pintiquiniestra.	
Riojavenatrix	Gen. et sp. nov	Valid	Isasmendi et al.	Early Cretaceous (Barremian–Aptian)	Enciso Group	Spain	A spinosaurid theropod. The type species is R. lacustris.	
Sasayamagnomus	Gen. et sp. nov.	Valid	Tanaka et al.	Early Cretaceous (Albian)	Ohyamashimo Formation	Japan	A basal member of Neoceratopsia. The type species is S. saegusai.	
Sidersaura	Gen. et sp. nov	Valid	Lerzo et al.	Late Cretaceous (Cenomanian–Turonian)	Huincul Formation	Argentina	A rebbachisaurid sauropod. The type species is S. marae.	
Thyreosaurus	Gen. et sp. nov	Valid	Zafaty et al.	Middle Jurassic	El Mers Group	Morocco	A stegosaurian. The type species is T. atlasicus.	
Tiamat	Gen. et sp. nov	Valid	Pereira et al.	Cretaceous (Albian–Cenomanian)	Açu Formation	Brazil	A basal titanosaur sauropod. The type species is T. valdecii.	
Tianzhenosaurus chengi	Sp. nov	Valid	Pang, Li & Guo	Late Cretaceous	Huiquanpu Formation	China	An ankylosaurid; a species of Tianzhenosaurus.	
Tietasaura	Gen. et sp. nov	Valid	Bandeira et al.	Early Cretaceous (Valanginian–Hauterivian)	Marfim Formation	Brazil	An elasmarian ornithopod. The type species is T. derbyiana.	
Titanomachya	Gen. et sp. nov	Valid	Pérez-Moreno et al.	Late Cretaceous (Campanian–Maastrichtian)	La Colonia Formation	Argentina	A titanosaur sauropod. The type species is T. gimenezi.	
Tyrannosaurus mcraeensis	Sp. nov	Valid	Dalman et al.	Late Cretaceous (Campanian–Maastrichtian)	Hall Lake Formation	United States (New Mexico)	A tyrannosaurine; a species of Tyrannosaurus.	
Udelartitan	Gen. et sp. nov	Valid	Soto et al.	Late Cretaceous	Guichón Formation	Uruguay	A titanosaur sauropod belonging to the group Saltasauroidea. The type species is U. celeste.	
Urbacodon norelli	Sp. nov		Wang et al.	Late Cretaceous	Iren Dabasu Formation	China	A troodontid theropod; a species of Urbacodon.	
Vectidromeus	Gen. et sp. nov	Valid	Longrich et al.	Early Cretaceous (Barremian)	Wessex Formation	United Kingdom	A hypsilophodontid. The type species is V. insularis. Announced in 2023; the final article version was published in 2024.	
Yanbeilong	Gen. et sp. nov	Valid	Jia et al.	Early Cretaceous (Albian)	Zuoyun Formation	China	A stegosaurian. The type species is Y. ultimus.	
Yuanyanglong	Gen. et sp. nov		Hao et al.	Early Cretaceous	Miaogou Formation	China	An oviraptorosaur theropod. The type species is Y. bainian. Announced in 2024; the final article version was published in 2025.	

=== General non-avian dinosaur research ===
- Review of studies on the phylogenetic relationships of main dinosaur groups from the preceding years is published by Lovegrove, Upchurch & Barrett (2024).
- Review of studies on the macroecology of non-avian dinosaurs from the preceding years is published by Chiarenza (2024).
- A study on diversity of Mesozoic dinosaurs throughout their evolutionary history is published by Mannion (2024).
- Review of main obstacles in the study of neurology of Mesozoic dinosaurs, and of advances in the study of dinosaur neurology, is published by Balanoff (2024).
- Evidence indicating that the evolution of rostral keratin cover was associated with partial tooth reduction throughout the evolutionary history of dinosaurs, but does not explain the complete loss of teeth in dinosaur lineages, is presented by Aguilar-Pedrayes, Gardner & Organ (2024).
- A study on the evolutionary rates of biting mechanics in herbivorous dinosaurs is published by Kunz and Sakamoto (2024), who interpret their findings as indicating that biomechanic evolution rates can reveal ecological signatures in different lineages and ontogenetic stages.
- Caspar et al. (2024) present revised estimates of encephalization and telencephalic neuron counts in dinosaurs, contesting neuron count and relative brain size estimates presented in the study of Herculano-Houzel (2023), and in particular contesting estimates of exceptional neuron counts and relative brain size in large-bodied theropods compared to other dinosaurs presented by the cited author.
- Evidence from the study of an ontogenetic series of endocasts of Psittacosaurus lujiatunesis and immature specimens of other non-avian dinosaur taxa, interpreted as indicating that non-avian dinosaurs had a distinct developmental trajectory of the brain compared to extant birds and crocodilians, is presented by King et al. (2024).
- Atterholt et al. (2024) report evidence of widespread presence of bony ridges in the neural canals in the caudal vertebrae of non-avian dinosaurs, and interpret the studied structures as likely bony spinal cord supports.
- A study on the evolution of the dinosaurian climatic niche landscape throughout the Mesozoic is published by Chiarenza et al. (2024), who report that the distribution of sauropodomorphs indicates their preference for warm environments, while ornithischians and theropods explored a broader range of environments with varied climates, and interpret the colonization of areas with colder climates by theropods since the Early Jurassic as likely related to the evolution of endothermy.
- Upchurch & Chiarenza (2024) review the studies of the biogeography of non-avian dinosaurs.
- Qvarnström et al. (2024) reconstruct food webs from five tetrapod communities from the Late Triassic and Early Jurassic of Poland on the basis of data from bromalites, and interpret changes in bromalite morphologies and their contents as related to shifts in faunal composition, with increased abundance of dinosaurs coinciding with decline of formerly dominant tetrapod groups; the authors also interpret their findings as indicating that early herbivorous dinosaurs had different feeding habits than dicynodonts and aetosaurs, and interpret the studied fossils as recording stepwise rise of dinosaurs to supremacy across 30 million years of evolution.
- Putative bone fragments of large-bodied dinosaurs from Rhaetian strata in France, Germany and United Kingdom are reinterpreted as fossil material of large-bodied ichthyosaurs by Perillo & Sander (2024).
- Romilio et al. (2024) describe dinosaur tracks from the Early Jurassic (Sinemurian) Razorback Beds (Australia), representing the oldest dinosaur tracks from the country to date.
- Troiano et al. (2024) report the discovery of an association of Early Cretaceous dinosaur tracks and petroglyphs from the Serrote do Letreiro Site (Brazil).
- Review of the fossil record of Late Triassic and Jurassic dinosaurs from India is published by Khosla & Lucas (2024).
- Maidment (2024) describes the diversity of dinosaurs from the upper Morrison Formation (United States) in time and space, and finds evidence supporting cladogenesis as a means of increasing diplodocine diversity over time, as well as spatial segregation of Allosaurus and Camarasaurus species.
- Tracks of medium to large theropods and small ornithopods are described from the Lower Cretaceous (Valanginian-Aptian) Wonthaggi Formation (Victoria, Australia) by Martin et al. (2024), confirming the presence of large theropods in the polar regions of Australia during the Early Cretaceous.
- Bandeira et al. (2024) revise dinosaur remains from the Lower Cretaceous Massacará and Ilhas groups (Recôncavo Basin, Brazil) collected between 1859 and 1906, and interpret the studied fossils as indicative of the presence of an Early Cretaceous dinosaur assemblage including theropods, sauropods and ornithopods.
- New dinosaur tracksite, preserving ornithopod, sauropod and theropod tracks, is described from the Lower Cretaceous (Aptian-Albian) Duoni Formation (Tibet, China) by Li et al. (2024).
- Navarro et al. (2024) report the discovery of a new tracksite preserving theropod, sauropod and ornithischian footprints from the Cenomanian–Turonian Santo Anastácio Formation (Brazil), representing the first dinosaur ichnofauna from the Bauru Group reported to date and providing evidence of presence of ornithischians in the studied area before environmental changes during the Cenomanian–Turonian interval.
- Kirkland et al. (2024) describe the biodiversity of Cretaceous dinosaurs from Utah (United States).
- Han et al. (2024) find that rising temperatures and rainfall intensity coincided with decline and eventual disappearance of dinosaurs from the Shanyang Basin (China) during the latest Cretaceous, and argue that the recorded decline of dinosaurs in the studied area was likely caused by increased rainfall that reduced availability of suitable nesting sites for dinosaurs.
- A study on the diversification of non-avian dinosaurs, inferred from available dinosaur phylogenies, is published by Allen et al. (2024), who find it impossible to decisively conclude whether dinosaurs experienced a decline in diversity before the Cretaceous–Paleogene extinction event on the basis of available data, noting the impact of the phylodynamic models used in the study (specifically their assumptions about sampling and changes in the number of species through time) on estimates of dinosaur evolutionary rates.

=== Saurischian research ===
- A study on the femoral histology of amniotes from the Triassic Ischigualasto Formation (Argentina), including early dinosaurs Chromogisaurus novasi, Eodromaeus murphi, Eoraptor lunensis, Herrerasaurus ischigualastensis and Sanjuansaurus gordilloi, is published by Curry Rogers et al. (2024), who find that early dinosaurs known from this formation grew at least as quickly as sauropodomorph and theropod dinosaurs from the later Mesozoic, and that their elevated growth rates did not set them apart from other amniotes living at the same time.
- New dinosaur tracksites from the Middle Jurassic Dongdaqiao Formation (China), preserving tracks of large-bodied theropods and small-bodied sauropods, are described by Chen et al. (2024).
- Danison et al. (2024) redescribe fossil material assigned to Saurophaganax maximus from the Late Jurassic Morrison Formation (Oklahoma, United States), and interpret it as a chimeric taxon with the holotype specimen representing a dubious saurischian, and other specimens belonging to a novel species of Allosaurus.
- Yuan et al. (2024) describe new tracks of sauropods and theropods from the Upper Jurassic–Lower Cretaceous Houcheng Formation (Hebei, China), and interpret the studied tracks as suggestive of successive evolution of the Yanliao Biota and the Jehol Biota, with no evidence of a complete turnover or extinction of biotas, as well as suggesting that the dinosaur diversity in the North China during the earliest Cretaceous was influenced by volcanic activity.
- Paio et al. (2024) describe a new rib fragment from the Campanian–Maastrichtian aged Marília Formation (Brazil), and interpret it as representing an indeterminate saurischian.

==== Theropod research ====
- Manafzadeh et al. (2024) argue that the knees of early theropod dinosaurs were restricted to hinge-like motion, and that the reduction of the fibula during the theropod evolution had significant biomechanical consequences for theropod locomotion, freeing the fibula from the ankle joint and ultimately enabling extreme knee long-axis rotation of extant birds.
- A study on the femoral shape variation in theropods, providing evidence of evolution of similar adaptations to gigantism in large-bodied theropods regardless of their phylogenetic affinities, is published by Pintore et al. (2024).
- Barker et al. (2024) identify spinosaurid, tyrannosauroid and dromaeosaurid material in the assemblage of theropod teeth from the Valanginian Wadhurst Clay Formation (United Kingdom), and interpret the studied assemblage as likely distinct from other theropod assemblages known from Wealden Supergroup strata.
- Dridi et al. (2024) describe tracks of medium to large-sized theropods from the Lower Cretaceous (Hauterivian–Barremian) strata from the Jebel Kebar locality (Bouhedma Formation, Tunisia), extending known geographic range of non-avian theropods to higher latitudes within Gondwana.
- A study on the affinities of shed tooth crowns of theropods from the Turonian-Coniacian Portezuelo Formation (Argentina), providing evidence of a previously undocumented diversity of theropods from this formation, is published by Meso et al. (2024).
- Isasmendi et al. (2024) describe new and revise known theropod teeth from the Maastrichtian strata from the South Pyrenean Basin (Spain), expanding known diversity of theropods from this basin and reporting evidence of theropod turnover during the Maastrichtian.
- A partial egg clutch including the smallest non-avian theropod eggs reported to date is described from the Upper Cretaceous Tangbian Formation (China) by Wu et al. (2024), who name a new ovaloolithid ootaxon Minioolithus ganzhouensis.
- McLarty & Esperante (2024) describe theropod tracks from the Maastrichtian strata from the Carreras Pampa tracksite (Bolivia) interpreted as likely preserving evidence of the trackmakers pausing during movement, bypassing an obstacle and crouching.
- Bugos & McDavid (2024) describe skulls of immature specimens of Coelophysis bauri from the Coelophysis Quarry at Ghost Ranch (New Mexico, United States).
- Marsh et al. (2024) describe post-cranial material from the Lower Jurassic Kayenta Formation (Utah, United States) and interpret it as belonging to an intermediate theropod.
- Liang, Falkingham & Xing (2024) present a digital skeleton model of Sinosaurus, based on data from a new, well-preserved specimen, and provide new body mass estimates for this theropod.
- Hendrickx et al. (2024) restudy the osteology, phylogenetic relationships, and feeding ecology of Noasaurus leali and name a new clade Berthasauridae.
- Mohabey et al. (2024) review and redescribe Laevisuchus indicus, Jubbulpuria tenuis and Compsosuchus solus, and describe a new noasaurid dentary from central India with procumbent dentition similar to the one present in Masiakasaurus.
- A study on the affinities of isolated theropod teeth from the Kem Kem Group (Morocco) is published by Hendrickx et al. (2024), who identify teeth of abelisaurids, spinosaurines, carcharodontosaurids and a non-abelisauroid ceratosaur or a megaraptoran.
- A probable ceratosaurid dentary is described from the Toarcian Cañadón Asfalto Formation (Argentina) by Pradelli, Pol & Ezcurra (2024), expanding known theropod diversity from this formation.
- A study on the affinities of isolated theropod teeth from the Bauru Basin (Brazil) is published by Delcourt et al. (2024), who argue that the geographical distribution of abelisaurids in South America was influenced by climatic conditions.
- Ribeiro et al. (2024) identify a theropod tooth from the Upper Jurassic-Lower Cretaceous Missão Velha Formation (Brazil) as the oldest abelisaurid record in the South America reported to date.
- A study in the bone histology of a mid-sized abelisaurid from the Upper Cretaceous Serra da Galga Formation (Brazil) is published by Aureliano et al. (2024), who report that, despite living in a semiarid tropical environment, the studied specimen had a growth rate similar to those of the Patagonian abelisaurids.
- Candeiro et al. (2024) describe abelisaurid teeth from the strata of the Marília Formation in the State of Goiás (Brazil), representing the northernmost abelisaurid record in the Bauru Basin reported to date.
- A study on the skeletal pathologies affecting known specimens of brachyrostran abelisaurids is published by Baiano et al. (2024), who diagnose the fusion of two caudal vertebrae of the holotype specimen of Aucasaurus garridoi as congenital malformation and diagnose partial fusion of five caudal vertebrae of the holotype of Elemgasem nubilus as spondyloraptropathy, in both cases representing the first occurrences of the diagnosed pathologies among non-tetanuran theropods.
- Cerroni, Otero & Novas (2024) present the reconstruction of the pelvic and hindlimb musculature of Skorpiovenator bustingorryi.
- Theropod teeth from the upper Campanian–lower Maastrichtian strata from the fossil site of Poyos (Villalba de la Sierra Formation, Spain) are identified as teeth of an abelisaurid that was likely closely related to Arcovenator by Malafaia et al. (2024).
- A study on the microarchitecture of bones of the axial skeleton of Majungasaurus and Rahonavis, providing evidence of increase of pneumatic complexity in early paravians compared to members of Ceratosauria, is published by Aureliano et al. (2024).
- Cau (2024) reinterprets "compsognathid" theropod specimens as juveniles of members of non-maniraptoriform tetanuran groups.
- Montealegre, Castillo-Visa & Sellés (2024) describe previously unpublished fossil material of theropods (cf. Protathlitis and a carcharodontosaurid which might be distinct from Concavenator) from the Barremian Arcillas de Morella Formation (Spain).
- Lacerda et al. (2024) describe new fossil material of spinosaurids (including a cervical vertebra of Sigilmassasaurus) and partial ischium of an indeterminate carcharodontosaurid from the Kem Kem Group (Morocco).
- Yun (2024) identifies convergent similarities in craniodental anatomy between spinosaurs and phytosaurs.
- D'Amore et al. (2024) study the morphology of the skull and teeth of spinosaurids, and find no evidence that the diets of spinosaurids were restricted to fish or small aquatic prey.
- A study on the diversity of spinosaurid teeth from the Camarillas Formation (Spain) is published by Cabrera-Argudo, García-Cobeña & Cobos (2024), who report possible evidence of the presence of at least one baryonychine and one spinosaurine in the eastern Iberian Peninsula during the early Barremian.
- The purported abelisaur ilium from the Upper Cretaceous Kem Kem Group (Morocco) described by Zitouni et al. (2019) is interpreted as a bone of a spinosaurine spinosaurid different from the ilium of the Spinosaurus aegyptiacus neotype by Samathi (2024), who considers the studied fossil to be likely evidence of the presence of two morphotypes of spinosaurines in the Kem Kem Group.
- Myhrvold et al. (2024) use statistical analyses to reconsider previous descriptions by Fabbri et al. (2022) of spinosaurs such as Spinosaurus as subaqueous foragers, and provide evidence that Spinosaurus was likely not an aquatic pursuit predator.
- Evidence from the study of patterns in skull shape, interpreted as indicating that Spinosaurus fed on aquatic prey and likely used the "stand-and-wait" predation strategy, is presented by Smart & Sakamoto (2024).
- Buffetaut & Tong (2024) reinterpret a purported ichthyosaur tooth from the Sao Khua Formation collected in 1962 and described in 1963 as a spinosaurid tooth and the first finding of a non-avian dinosaur fossil reported from Thailand.
- Evidence of large ranges of extension and flexion of manual joints and limited range of motion of the shoulder joints of Allosaurus fragilis is presented by Liang et al. (2024).
- Burigo & Mateus (2024) interpret Allosaurus europaeus as a valid species more closely related to A. jimmadseni than to A. fragilis, and interpret purported fossil material of a member of the genus Allosaurus from the Cretaceous Mifune Group (Japan) as belonging to a member of the genus Segnosaurus instead.
- A dorsal vertebra of an indeterminate carcharodontosaurid with similarities to the vertebrae of Acrocanthosaurus is described from the Turonian Bissekty Formation (Uzbekistan) by Averianov & Sues (2024).
- Rolando et al. (2024) describe a second specimen of Taurovenator violantei, expanding on the known anatomy of this genus.
- Rowe & Rayfield (2024) study the biomechanical capabilities of the skulls of tyrannosauroid theropods with different body size and skull morphology, and find that larger tyrannosauroids experienced higher absolute stresses in their skulls during feeding compared to their small-bodied relatives, and that wide skulls of tyrannosaurids enabled them to better accommodate high stresses during feeding.
- A study on tooth replacement pattern of Guanlong wucaii is published by Ke, Pei & Xu (2024).
- Teeth of a probable basal tyrannosauroid are described from the Upper Jurassic Phu Kradung Formation (Thailand) by Chowchuvech et al. (2024).
- Xing et al. (2024) describe large tyrannosauroid teeth from the Maastrichtian Dalangshan Formation, representing the southernmost record of tyrannosauroids in China reported to date.
- LeBlanc et al. (2024) report that extant Komodo dragons maintain cutting edges of their teeth through iron-enriched coatings on their tooth serrations and tips, argue that iron sequestration is probably widespread in reptile enamels, but also find no evidence of iron coatings along theropod dinosaur tooth serrations, report that tyrannosaurids had specialized, wavy enamel along their tooth serrations that likely supported the cutting edges of the teeth, and interpret these findings as either indicative of different feeding strategies of tyrannosaurids and Komodo dragons, or indicating that only large theropods had tooth enamel that was thick enough to significantly influence the mechanical wear of the tooth serrations.
- Słowiak, Brusatte & Szczygielski (2024) reevaluate the fossil material attributed to Bagaraatan ostromi, interpreting the holotype as an indeterminate juvenile tyrannosaurid, and reporting that some of the fossils originally attributed to B. ostromi are actually caenagnathid bones.
- Yun (2024) estimates mandibular force profiles of Alioramus altai and Qianzhousaurus sinensis, interpreting the mandibles of the studied theropods as likely unsuited for delivering powerful bites and enduring high stresses caused by capturing, holding and dismembering large prey.
- Evidence from the study of skull bones of immature specimens of Daspletosaurus from the Dinosaur Park Formation (Alberta, Canada), indicating that skull material of Daspletosaurus and Gorgosaurus can be confidently identified regardless of ontogenetic stage of the specimens, is presented by Coppock et al. (2024).
- A study on the affinities of tyrannosaurines is published by Warshaw, Barrera Guevara & Fowler (2024), who contest the conclusions of the study of Scherer & Voiculescu-Holvad (2023), recovering recognized Daspletosaurus species as representing a single anagenetic lineage ancestral to Tyrannosaurus-line tyrannosaurines.
- Longrich & Saitta (2024) review the taxonomic status of Nanotyrannus and argue that multiple lines of evidence support it as a distinct, small-bodied, possibly non-tyrannosaurid taxon, rather than an immature form of Tyrannosaurus.
- Mallon & Hone (2024) estimate that past sampling efforts likely resulted in sampling even the 99th percentile of body mass reached by Tyrannosaurus rex, and that the very largest members of the species might have been up to 70% larger than the largest currently known specimens, reaching approximately 15,000 (± 3750) kg of body mass.
- A study on the phylogenetic relationships of Kinnareemimus khonkaenensis is published by Samathi (2024).
- A study on the phylogenetic relationships of alvarezsaurians and on the evolution of their body mass is published by Meso et al. (2024).
- Gianechini et al. (2024) describe and indeterminate alvarezsaurian femur from the Plottier Formation (Argentina), filling a temporal gap (between Coniacian and Santonian) in the fossil record of Late Cretaceous Patagonian alvarezsaurians.
- Description of the skeletal anatomy of Nothronychus graffami and N. mckinleyi, providing evidence of the presence of traits convergent with extant birds, ornithischian dinosaurs and titanosaur sauropods, is published by Smith & Gillette (2024).
- A study on the biomechanics of the hindlimbs of Nothronychus is published by Smith (2024), who infers a waddling gait for the studied theropods.
- Park et al. (2024) propose that early pennaraptorans might have used their pennaceous feathers to flush hiding insects and to generate lift or drag during the pursuit of the flushed insects, and propose that such use of the pennaceous feathers might have contributed to the evolution of larger and stiffer feathers.
- A characterization of how number and shape of flight feathers correlate with locomotory style in extant birds is published by Kiat & O'Connor (2024). Extrapolating these patterns to Mesozoic pennaraptorans, the authors suggest that Caudipteryx and anchiornithines may have been secondarily flightless.
- A study on the evolution of the pectoral girdle of pennaraptorans is published by Wu et al. (2024), who report evidence of modifications changing the range of motion of the forelimb that preceded the origin of flight in paravians, as well as evidence of subsequent flight adaptive modifications in avialans.
- Meade et al. (2024) report evidence indicating that the ability of the skull to resist large mechanical stresses appeared early in oviraptorosaur evolution, before the appearance of the highly modified oviraptorid cranial architecture.
- The first caenagnathid fossil material from the upper Campanian De-na-zin Member of the Kirtland Formation (New Mexico, United States) is described by Funston, Williamson & Brusatte (2024).
- Qiu et al. (2024) describe the skeletal anatomy of the wrist of Heyuannia huangi, providing evidence of a specialized wrist morphology that was functionally convergent with the wrist morphology of extant birds.
- Description of the skeletal anatomy of Oksoko avarsan is published by Funston (2024).
- Zhu, Wang & Wang (2024) study the microstructural variation of elongatoolithid eggs from China, and interpret the studied variation as indicating that not all elongatoolithid eggshells can be related to oviraptorosaurs.
- A study on the skull shape and bite mechanics of dromaeosaurids is published by Tse, Miller & Pittman (2024), who interpret Deinonychus antirrhopus as adapted to taking large vertebrate prey, and interpret Halszkaraptor escuilliei as unlikely to feed on fish, and more likely to have a feeding ecology similar to those of extant waterfowl.
- Possible dromaeosaurid eggs are described from the Upper Cretaceous Lianhe Formation (China) by Wu et al. (2024), who name a new ootaxon Gannanoolithus yingliangi, and interpret the discovery of paired eggs of Gannanoolithus as possible evidence that dromaeosaurids had paired functional oviducts.
- Motta et al. (2024) interpret Imperobator antarcticus as a member of Unenlagiidae.
- Gianechini, Colli & Makovicky (2024) present a reconstruction of the pelvic and hindlimb musculature of Buitreraptor gonzalezorum.
- Dececchi et al. (2024) interpret two-toed theropod trackway Dromaeosauriformipes rarus from the Cretaceous Jinju Formation (South Korea) produced by a small microraptorine moving at high speed as evidence of wing-assisted movement of a non-avian theropod; that interpretation of the studied trackway is subsequently contested by Falkingham & Lallensack (2025) and reaffirmed by Dececchi et al. (2025).
- A juvenile specimen of Microraptor, representing the smallest dromaeosaurid specimen from the Jehol Biota reported to date and preserving anatomical details that are poorly preserved in the other specimens of Microraptor, is described from the Jiufotang Formation (China) by Wang & Pei (2024), who also introduce the name Serraraptoria for the most inclusive clade containing Microraptor zhaoianus and Velociraptor mongoliensis but not Mahakala omnogovae, Halszkaraptor escuilliei and Unenlagia comahuensis.
- A study on the biomechanics of the mandible and probable feeding behavior of Acheroraptor temertyorum is published by Yun (2024).
- Based on comparisons to extant birds, joint poses in the foot of Deinonychus during its walk cycle are reconstructed by Manafzadeh, Gatesy & Bhullar (2024).
- Description of the braincase and cranial endocast of Sinovenator changii, interpreted as morphologically intermediate between basal theropods and extant birds, is published by Yu et al. (2024).
- Xing et al. (2024) describe tracks from the Upper Cretaceous Shaxian Formation (Fujian, China) which might have been produced by a large-bodied (estimated hip height of over 1.8 m) troodontid, and name a new ichnotaxon Fujianipus yingliangi.
- Description of the anatomy of the skull of Anchiornis huxleyi is published by Wang et al. (2024).

==== Sauropodomorph research ====
- Frauenfelder et al. (2024) reevaluate the utility of sauropodomorph tooth measurement indices as proxies for classification of the studied dinosaurs.
- Müller, Damke & Terras (2024) find that inclusion of skeletally immature individuals in the phylogenetic analyses of early Late Triassic sauropodomorphs results in the artificial grouping of the immature specimens in the phylogenetic trees.
- Damke et al. (2024) describe fossil material of at least three specimens of Saturnalia tupiniquim from the Candelária Sequence of the Santa Maria Supersequence (Brazil), providing new information on the skeletal anatomy of members of this species (including the first preserved rostrum) and its variation among members of this species.
- Silva et al. (2024) describe fossil material of a member or a relative of the group Bagualosauria from the Vila Botucaraí site (Candelária Sequence of the Santa Maria Supersequence, Brazil), representing the first sauropodomorph reported from this site.
- Evidence of variability of the pneumacity patterns of the cervical and dorsal vertebrae in Plateosaurus is presented by Regalado Fernández (2024).
- Redescription of the holotype and a study on the affinities of Plateosaurus trossingensis is published by Schaeffer (2024).
- Schaeffer et al. (2024) describe pathologies in the chevrons of the tail in two specimens of Plateosaurus trossingensis from the Obere Mühle locality in Trossingen (Germany), report pathologies in the tail chevrons in further specimens indicating that chevrons were a vulnerable part of the tail, and interpret the affected individuals as able to recover without too many complications as long as there was no severe functional damage inflicted.
- Zhao et al (2024) describe a new juvenile–subadult massospondylid specimen from the Lower Jurassic Lufeng Formation (Yunnan, China), increasing known diversity of massospondylids from Asia.
- "Gyposaurus" sinensis is interpreted as a probable junior synonym of Lufengosaurus huenei by Wang, Zhao & You (2024).
- Reisz et al. (2024) report that bone development in the femora of Lufengosaurus is closer to that of altricial pigeons than precocious chickens, and argue that Lufengosaurus hatchlings were likely altricial.
- Barrett & Choiniere (2024) redescribe the skeletal anatomy of Melanorosaurus readi and designate the lectotype of this species.
- A study on the histology of teeth and on the evolution of tooth replacement patterns in sauropod dinosaurs is published by D'Emic et al. (2024).
- Kareem, Chakraborty & Wilson Mantilla (2024) report evidence of the presence of tail clubs in Kotasaurus yamanpalliensis, sharing morphological similarities with tail clubs of Omeisaurus tianfuensis and Shunosaurus lii.
- Redescription of the skull anatomy of Bagualia alba is published by Gomez, Carballido & Pol (2024).
- Using Spinophorosaurus as an example, Vidal (2024) explains how virtual 3D models of sauropods have enabled an understanding of their biomechanics.
- Agustí, Alcalá & Santos-Cubedo (2024) propose that sauropod gigantism was an adaptation that increased the ability of sauropods to travel great distances, necessitated by pronounced seasonal changes.
- Santos et al. (2024) coin a replacement name Galinhapodus for the ichnogenus Polyonyx including sauropod tracks from the Middle Jurassic Serra de Aire Formation (Portugal).
- Butler et al. (2024) describe an assemblage of tracks produced by large-bodied sauropods passing through coastal lagoonal environment from the earliest Cretaceous strata of the Durlston Formation (Dorset, United Kingdom), representing the largest dinosaur track site accessible within the Purbeck Group reported to date.
- Boisvert et al. (2024) describe a new specimen of Haplocanthosaurus sp. from the Dry Mesa Dinosaur Quarry (Colorado, United States), extending known range of the genus into the true Brushy Basin Member of the Morrison Formation, and likely representing the geologically youngest occurrence of Haplocanthosaurus on the Colorado Plateau.
- King et al. (2024) report evidence of a previously unknown form of pneumaticity in a rib of a member of the genus Apatosaurus, and propose that rib pneumaticity among apatosaurines is individually variable.
- Windholz et al. (2024) describe a new rebbachisaurid caudal vertebra from the Cenomanian Candeleros Formation (Argentina), providing new information on the caudal anatomy and pneumaticity in rebbachisaurids.
- A study on the morphology of teeth of Europasaurus holgeri is published by Régent et al. (2024), who report evidence interpreted as indicative of the presence of a strong connective tissue that partially covered the teeth, and argue that such structure might have been present in other members of Eusauropoda.
- Gomes et al. (2024) describe a well-preserved trackway of a large sauropod (probably a titanosauriform with a mosaic of basal and derived features) with a unique set of characteristics from the Lower Cretaceous Sousa Formation (Brazil), and name a new ichnotaxon Sousatitanosauripus robsoni.
- A trackway produced by an early juvenile titanosauriform sauropod is described from the Cenomanian Jindong Formation (South Korea) by Yoon et al. (2024), who compare this trackway with other sauropod trackways from the Jindong Formation, and report evidence that trackway gauges got narrower as pes length increased.
- Gomez et al. (2024) describe new titanosauriform fossils from the Portezuelo Formation (Argentina), expanding known diversity of sauropods from this formation.
- A titanosauriform femur belonging to a subadult individual that reached a significantly larger size than other titanosauriform specimens with modified lamellar bone tissue at a similar growth stage is described from the Upper Cretaceous Bayan Shireh Formation (Mongolia) by Witasik, Słowiak & Szczygielski (2024), indicating that the characteristic modified laminar bone tissue of titanosauriform did not prevent those sauropods from achieving large body size.
- Beeston et al. (2024) describe new sauropod material from the Winton Formation (Australia), and interpret Australotitan cooperensis as an indeterminate diamantinasaurian that is likely a junior synonym of Diamantinasaurus matildae.
- Filippi et al. (2024) study fossil material of sauropods from the Cerro Overo – La Invernada area (Bajo de la Carpa Formation; Neuquén Province, Argentina), interpreted as suggestive of the presence of a diverse fauna of titanosauriforms coexisting in the environment during the Santonian.
- A study on the taphonomy of the fossil material of Kaijutitan maui and on its bone histology is published by Filippi, Previtera & Garrido (2024).
- A study on the tail vertebrae of Adamantisaurus mezzalirai and Baurutitan britoi is published by Vidal et al. (2024), who interpret the studied titanosaurs as keeping their tail close to the ground, with their tails likely functioning as the fifth stabilizing member of the body.
- Vidal et al. (2024) study the range of motion of the axial series of Trigonosaurus pricei, and interpret it as capable of high elevation of the neck.
- A study on the morphological variability of titanosaur femora from the Campanian-Maastrichtian Ibero-Armorican domain, providing evidence of the presence of Lirainosaurinae and sauropods with affinities with large-bodied late Maastrichtian titanosaurs, is published by Páramo, Mocho & Ortega (2024).
- A study on the extent of the postcranial pneumaticity in saltasaurines and other derived titanosaurs is published by Zurriaguz (2024).
- A description and study of the morphological variability of sauropod appendicular remains from Maastrichtian sites of the Hațeg, Transylvanian, and Rusca Montană basins (Romania) is published by Mocho, Pérez-García & Codrea (2024), who interpret the studied remains as indicative of the presence of four or five sauropod taxa on the Hațeg Island during the Maastrichtian, including a titanosaur lineage with an extremely elongated manus.
- An overview of the largest known sauropods from Argentina is published by Calvo (2024).

=== Ornithischian research ===
- A study on the phylogenetic relationships of ornithischians is published by Fonseca et al. (2024), who name the new clades Pyrodontia and Tenontosauridae.
- A study on the early evolution of the ornithischian bauplan is published by Norman et al. (2024).
- Maisch & Maisch (2024) interpret the lost holotype specimen of "Plateosaurus" ornatus from the Rhaetian or Hettangian strata from the Schlösslesmühle bonebed (Baden-Württemberg, Germany) as a tooth of an early ornithischian with similarities to teeth of ankylosaurids.
- A study on the taxonomic affinities of isolated ornithischian teeth from Bathonian microvertebrate sites in the United Kingdom, providing evidence of the presence of a previously unknown, diverse ornithischian fauna, is published by Wills, Underwood & Barrett (2024).
- A study on tooth replacement pattern in Jeholosaurus shangyuanensis, providing evidence that teeth replacement rate slowed during ontogeny, is published by Hu et al. (2024).
- Redescription of the skeletal anatomy and a study on the affinities of Oryctodromeus cubicularis is published by Krumenacker et al. (2024).
- An osteology and phylogenetic analysis on Ajkaceratops kozmai, suggesting the initial classification of the species as a ceratopsian as uncertain and thus regarded as an enigmatic ornithischian, was published by Czepiński and Madzia (2024).
- Lee et al., (2024) described the single pedal phalanx of the basal neornithischian (NHCG 10972) from the Lower Cretaceous Tando beds of South Korea, which is most similar to Jeholosauridae.

==== Thyreophoran research ====
- Satchell (2024) reidentified the proximal femur fragment (BELUM K3998) from the Lias Group of Northern Ireland as an indeterminate dinosaur remain, not a potential specimen of Scelidosaurus or an ornithischian.
- Castanera, Mampel & Cobos (2024) describe new stegosaur tracks from the Upper Jurassic Villar del Arzobispo Formation (Spain), providing evidence of gregarious behavior in stegosaurs.
- Sánchez-Fenollosa, Escaso & Cobos (2024) describe a new specimen of Dacentrurus armatus from the Upper Jurassic Villar del Arzobispo Formation (Spain), propose a new diagnosis for this species, and interpret Miragaia longicollum as a junior synonym of D. armatus.
- Lategano, Conti & Lozar (2024) study the stress resistance of the tail of Miragaia longicollum, interpret its tail as capable of achieving high speed and pressure, but also interpret its tail spines as less robust than those of Stegosaurus stenops, and consider their findings to be indicative of a defensive strategy that prioritized intimidation over direct physical combat.
- The first stegosaurian fossil material from Gansu (China), assigned to Stegosaurus sp., is described from the Lower Cretaceous Hekou Group by Li et al. (2024).
- Cross and Arbour (2024) describe an ankylosaur femur from the Cenomanian Dunvegan Formation (British Columbia, Canada).
- Soto Acuña, Vargas & Kaluza (2024) redescribe the holotype specimen of Antarctopelta from the Snow Hill Island Formation (Antarctica), and provide support for its phylogenetic position within the Parankylosauria.
- A study on the microstructure and probable developmental origin of small ossicles forming between osteoderms of Antarctopelta oliveroi is published by Sanchez et al. (2024).

==== Cerapod research ====
- Evidence of increase of total tooth volume and rates of tooth wear throughout the evolutionary history of ornithopod dinosaurs is presented by Ősi et al. (2024), who interpret early-diverging ornithopods as likely browsers or frugivores, and that the diets of derived ornithopods likely involved bulk feeding on more resistant, less nutritious forage.
- Alarcón-Muñoz et al. (2024) describe a vertebra of a non-hadrosauroid iguanodontian from the Lower Cretaceous Quebrada Monardes Formation (Chile), providing evidence of the presence of such ornithopods in the southwestern margin of Gondwana since at least the Early Cretaceous.
- A review of Early Cretaceous Spanish styracosterns from the Maestrat Basin published by Santos-Cubedo (2024).
- Escanero-Aguilar et al. (2024) describe skull material of a hadrosauriform ornithopod from the Lower Cretaceous Castrillo de la Reina Formation (Spain), interpreted as more derived than Iguanodon but more basal than Proa, and expanding known diversity of ornithopods from the Cameros Basin.
- Hayashi et al. (2024) report the discovery of a probable hadrosauroid vertebra from the Upper Cretaceous Hiketa Formation (Izumi Group) in Sanuki, Kagawa Prefecture, providing additional evidence of dispersal of hadrosauriforms into the area of present-day Japan by the Campanian.
- Nikolov, Dochev, & Brusatte (2024) test the ontogenetic age of small hadrosauroid bones from the Late Cretaceous (Maastrichtian) Kaylaka Formation (Bulgaria), and determine that the specimen likely belonged to a late juvenile or young subadult, rather than a dwarved adult, and suggest that large terrestrial animals were able to populate some European islands via a cyclically appearing or short-lived dispersal route.
- Van der Linden et al. (2024) describe spheroolithid eggshells from the Maastrichtian Argiles et Grès à Reptiles Formation, probably representing the first hadrosauroid eggshells reported from France, and name a new ootaxon Paraspheroolithus porcarboris.
- A study on the morphological variability of hadrosaurid teeth, and on their utility for the studies of phylogenetic relationships of hadrosaurids, is published by Dudgeon, Gallimore & Evans (2024).
- The first described hadrosaurid footprints from the Horseshoe Canyon Formation are described by Powers et al. (2024), who assign them to the ichnospecies Hadrosauropodus langstoni.
- A study on three bonebeds from the Upper Cretaceous Oldman Formation (Alberta, Canada) and Two Medicine Formation (Montana, United States) preserving remains of specimens of Hypacrosaurus stebingeri is published by Joubarne, Therrien & Zelenitsky (2024), who interpret the studied assemblages as indicating that H. stebingeri individuals lived in age-segregated groups until into their fourth year of life.
- Evidence from the study of a skull of a juvenile hadrosaurine from the Campanian Dinosaur Park Formation (Alberta, Canada), interpreted as indicative of differences in the dental battery development between hadrosaurid species which might have been related to dietary differences during early ontogeny, is presented by Warnock-Juteau et al. (2024).
- Sharpe et al. (2024) describe fossil material of a probable immature specimen of Edmontosaurus regalis from the Horseshoe Canyon Formation, and interpret its similarities to Ugrunaaluk kuukpikensis as supporting the referral of the Alaskan saurolophine material to Edmontosaurus cf. regalis.
- Wick & Lehman (2024) describe fossil material of a juvenile pachycephalosaur specimen belonging to the genus Stegoceras from the Campanian Aguja Formation (Texas, United States), providing new information on the ontogeny of members of this genus, and interpret the holotype of Texacephale langstoni as a probable adult individual belonging to the genus Stegoceras.
- Hu et al. (2024) reconstruct endocasts of Yinlong, Liaoceratops and Psittacosaurus, and interpret early ceratopsians as having more sensitive sense of smell and as adapted to hearing higher frequencies than their late-diverging relatives.
- A study on the bone histology of Yinlong downsi is published by Han et al. (2024), who report evidence indicating that Y. downsi reached sexual maturity earlier than Psittacosaurus but later than ceratopsids, and evidence of growth rates higher than those of extant squamates and crocodiles but lower than those of large-sized dinosaurs and extant mammals and birds.
- Description of the morphology of the skull and endocranium of Psittacosaurus sibiricus, based on the study of both juvenile and adult specimens, is published by Podlesnov et al. (2024).
- A description endocranial anatomy of the Psittacosaurus lujiatunensis published by Sakagami et al. (2024).
- Yang et al. (2024) describe a well-preserved scaled skin of a specimen of Psittacosaurus from the Early Cretaceous Jehol Biota of China, providing evidence of preservation of epidermal layers, corneocytes and melanosomes, and interpret the studied specimen as indicative of co-occurrence of feathers and reptile-type skin in non-feathered regions of the skin in Psittacosaurus.
- Witton & Hing (2024) argue that there is no compelling evidence indicating that the development of the idea of the griffin was inspired by the discovery of fossils of Protoceratops.
- Demers-Potvin & Larsson (2024) describe fossil material of Centrosaurus apertus from the strata of the Campanian Dinosaur Park Formation in Saskatchewan Landing Provincial Park (Canada), expanding known geographical range of this species.
- Barrera Guevara et al. (2024) reinterpret fossil material of Coahuilaceratops magnacuerna as derived from Cerro Huerta Formation (and representing the first dinosaur taxon described from this formation) rather than from Cerro del Pueblo Formation.

== Birds ==
=== New bird taxa ===
Name	Novelty	Status	Authors	Age	Type locality	Country	Notes	Images
Agapornis longipes	Sp. nov	In press	Pavia et al.	Plio–Pleistocene transition	Cradle of Humankind	South Africa	A lovebird; a species of Agapornis.	
Ardenna buchananbrowni	Sp. nov	Valid	Tennyson et al.	Pliocene (Waipipian)	Tangahoe Formation	New Zealand	A species of Ardenna.	
Avisaurus darwini	Sp. nov	Valid	Clark et al.	Late Cretaceous (Maastrichtian)	Hell Creek Formation	United States (Montana)	A member of Enantiornithes belonging to the family Avisauridae.	
Bambusicola wenzensis	Comb. nov	Valid	(Jánossý)	Pliocene		Poland	A bamboo partridge; moved from Francolinus capeki wenzensis Jánossý (1974).	
Buteo chimborazoensis	Sp. nov		Lo Coco, Agnolín & Carrión	Pleistocene		Ecuador	A species of Buteo.	
Chauvireria axaina	Sp. nov	Valid	Zelenkov	Miocene		Russia (Rostov Oblast); Ukraine		
Chauvireria egorovkensis	Sp. nov	Valid	Zelenkov	Miocene		Ukraine		
Chauvireria minor	Comb. nov	Valid	(Jánossý)	Miocene		Mongolia; Poland; Russia (Buryatia; Voronezh Oblast?); Ukraine	Moved from Francolinus (Lambrechtia) minor Jánossý (1974).	
Chloephaga dabbenei	Sp. nov	Valid	Agnolín, Álvarez Herrera & Tomassini	Pleistocene		Argentina	A species of Chloephaga.	
Coturnix augustus	Sp. nov	Valid	Zelenkov	Pliocene		Mongolia	A species of Coturnix.	
Enkuria	Gen. et sp. et comb. nov	Valid	Zelenkov	Pliocene and Pleistocene		Crimea	A relative of the grey partridge. The type species is E. voinstvenskyi; genus also includes "Phasianus" etuliensis Bocheński & Kurochkin (1987) from Moldova.	
Eocypselus geminus	Sp. nov	Valid	Mayr & Kitchener	Eocene	London Clay	United Kingdom	A species of Eocypselus.	
Eocypselus grandissimus	Sp. nov	Valid	Mayr & Kitchener	Eocene	London Clay	United Kingdom	A species of Eocypselus.	
Eocypselus paulomajor	Sp. nov	Valid	Mayr & Kitchener	Eocene	London Clay	United Kingdom	A species of Eocypselus.	
Fluvioviridavis michaeldanielsi	Sp. nov		Mayr & Kitchener	Eocene	London Clay	United Kingdom	A species of Fluvioviridavis.	
Fluvioviridavis nazensis	Sp. nov		Mayr & Kitchener	Eocene	London Clay	United Kingdom	A species of Fluvioviridavis.	
Imparavis	Gen. et sp. nov	Valid	Wang et al.	Early Cretaceous	Jiufotang Formation	China	An enantiornithine. The type species is I. attenboroughi.	
Kustokazanser	Gen. et comb. nov		Zelenkov	Late Eocene	Aksyir Svita	Kazakhstan	An anseriform of uncertain placement; a new genus for "Cygnavus" formosus.	
Lumbrerornis	Gen. et sp. nov	Valid	Bertelli et al.	Eocene (Lutetian)	Lumbrera Formation	Argentina	A bird of uncertain affinities, possibly related to the families Palaeotididae and Geranoididae. The type species is L. rougieri.	
Magnusavis	Gen. et sp. nov	Valid	Clark et al.	Late Cretaceous (Maastrichtian)	Hell Creek Formation	United States (Montana)	A member of Enantiornithes. The type species is M. ekalakaenis.	
Marocortyx	Gen. et comb. nov	Valid	Zelenkov	Pliocene and Pleistocene		Morocco; Spain	A member of the family Phasianidae belonging to the tribe Coturnicini. The type species is "Plioperdix" africana Mourer-Chauviré & Geraads (2010); genus also includes "Palaeocryptonyx" novaki Sánchez Marco (2009).	
?Masillatrogon incertus	Sp. nov	Valid	Mayr & Kitchener	Eocene	London Clay	United Kingdom	A trogon.	
Melanitta kirbori	Sp. nov	Valid	Zelenkov	Lower Pleistocene	Taurida Cave	Crimea	A scoter; a species of Melanitta.	
Miochelidon	Gen. et sp. nov		Volkova	Miocene	Tagay Formation	Russia	A swallow. The type species is M. eschata.	
Mionetta turgaiensis	Sp. nov		Zelenkov	Early Oligocene	Chelkarnura Formation	Kazakhstan	A species of Mionetta.	
Nasiornis	Gen. et sp. nov	In press	Mayr & Kitchener	Eocene	London Clay	United Kingdom	A messelornithid. The type species is N. messelornithoides.	
Navaornis	Gen. et sp. nov	Valid	Chiappe et al.	Late Cretaceous	Adamantina Formation	Brazil	A member of Enantiornithes. The type species is N. hestiae.	
Neobohaiornis	Gen. et sp. nov		Shen et al.	Early Cretaceous	Jiufotang Formation	China	A member of Enantiornithes in the family Bohaiornithidae. The type species is N. lamadongensis.	
Paakniwatavis	Gen. et sp. nov	Valid	Musser & Clarke	Eocene	Green River Formation	United States (Wyoming)	An early member of Anseriformes. The type species is P. grandei.	
Pakudyptes	Gen. et sp. nov		Ando et al.	Late Oligocene	Otekaike Limestone	New Zealand	An early penguin. The type species is P. hakataramea.	
Palaeocryptonyx capeki	Comb. nov	Valid	(Lambrecht)	Pleistocene		Poland; Romania; Russia (Krasnodar Krai)	A member of the family Phasianidae belonging to the tribe Coturnicini; moved from Francolinus capeki Lambrecht (1933).	
Palaeoperdix hungarica	Comb. nov	Valid	(Jánossý)	Miocene		Hungary	A member of the family Phasianidae belonging to the tribe Coturnicini; moved from Palaeocryptonyx hungaricus Jánossý (1991).	
Palaeoperdix miocenica	Comb. nov	Valid	(Villalta)	Miocene		Spain	A member of the family Phasianidae belonging to the tribe Coturnicini; moved from Coturnix(?) miocenica Villalta (1963).	
Paralyra	Gen. et comb. nov	Valid	Zelenkov	Pliocene and Pleistocene		Poland	A grouse; a new genus for "Lagopus lagopus" atavus Jánossy (1974), originally described from the Rębielice Królewskie 1 locality in Poland, subsequently also described from the Taurida Cave in Crimea.	
?Paraortygoides argillae	Sp. nov		Mayr & Kitchener	Eocene (Ypresian)	London Clay	United Kingdom	A member of Galliformes, possibly belonging to the family Gallinuloididae.	
?Parvirallus incertus	Sp. nov	In press	Mayr & Kitchener	Eocene	London Clay	United Kingdom	A messelornithid; a possible species of Parvirallus.	
Phalacrocorax bakonyiensis	Sp. nov	Valid	Horváth, Futó, & Kessler	Miocene		Hungary	A cormorant; a species of Phalacrocorax.	
Plioperdix boevi	Sp. nov	Valid	Zelenkov	Miocene		Russia (Rostov Oblast; Stavropol Krai)	A member of the family Phasianidae belonging to the tribe Coturnicini.	
Pristineanis	Gen. et 2 sp. et comb. nov	Valid	Mayr & Kitchener	Eocene	London Clay	United Kingdom; United States	A possible member of Piciformes. The type species is P. minor; genus also includes new species P. major, as well as "Neanis" kistneri Feduccia (1973).	
Prophaethon waltonensis	Sp. nov	Valid	Mayr & Kitchener	Eocene	London Clay	United Kingdom	A member of the family Prophaethontidae.	
Pterodroma zinorum	Sp. nov	Valid	Rando et al.	Quaternary		Portugal (Azores)	A gadfly petrel.	
Septencoracias simillimus	Sp. nov	Valid	Mayr & Kitchener	Eocene (Ypresian)	London Clay	United Kingdom	A stem group roller belonging or related to the family Primobucconidae.	
Shuilingornis	Gen. et sp. nov		Wang et al.	Early Cretaceous	Jiufotang Formation	China	A euornithe in the family Gansuidae. The type species is S. angelai.	
Sulcitarsus	Gen. et sp. nov	Valid	Mayr & Kitchener	Eocene	London Clay	United Kingdom	A bird of uncertain affinities, with similarities of hindlimb elements to those of cuckoo-rollers and members of Accipitriformes. The type species is S. aenigmatus.	
Tologuica vetusta	Sp. nov	Valid	Zelenkov	Miocene	Tagay Formation	Russia (Irkutsk Oblast)	A member of the family Phasianidae belonging to the tribe Coturnicini.	
Torgos platycephalus	Sp. nov	Valid	Gorbatcheva & Zelenkov	Pleistocene		Azerbaijan	A vulture, a species of Torgos.	
Ukugyps	Gen. et sp. nov		Lo Coco, Agnolín & Carrión	Pleistocene		Ecuador	A condor. The type species is U. orcesi.	
Uyrekura	Gen. et sp. nov		Zelenkov	Early Oligocene	Chelkarnura Formation	Kazakhstan	An anatid of uncertain placement. The type species is U. chalkarica.	
Walbeckornis waltonensis	Sp. nov	In press	Mayr & Kitchener	Eocene	London Clay	United Kingdom	A species of Walbeckornis.	
Waltonirrisor	Gen. et sp. nov	Valid	Mayr & Kitchener	Eocene (Ypresian)	London Clay	United Kingdom	A member of Upupiformes. The type species is W. tendringensis.	
Waltonortyx	Gen. et sp. nov		Mayr & Kitchener	Eocene (Ypresian)	London Clay	United Kingdom	A member of Galliformes, the type genus of the new family Waltonortygidae. The type species is W. bumbanipodiides.	
Wunketru	Gen. et comb. nov	Valid	De Mendoza, Degrange & Tambussi	Eocene	Las Flores Formation	Argentina	A member of Anseriformes of uncertain affinites; a new genus for "Telmabates" howardae.	
Xenavicula	Gen. et sp. nov	Valid	Mayr & Kitchener	Eocene	London Clay	United Kingdom	A bird of uncertain affinities, with similarities to members of Telluraves, the type genus of the new family Xenaviculidae. The type species is X. pamelae.	
Ypresicolius	Gen. et sp. nov	Valid	Mayr & Kitchener	Eocene	London Clay	United Kingdom	A mousebird. The type species is Y. sandcoleiformis.	

=== Avian research ===
- A study performing quantitative functional imaging of the brain during rest and flight in rock doves with implications for the evolution of avian flight is published by Balanoff et al. (2024). They found increased neural activity in the cerebellum during flight, and through comparisons with cranial endocasts of extinct theropods, suggest that cerebellar expansion underlying such activity occurred at the base of Maniraptora, prior to the origin of avian flight.
- The Cretaceous fossil record of avialans from China is reviewed by Zhou & Wang (2024).
- Evidence of gradual and sequential moult of wing flight feathers in two probable members of Confuciusornithiformes from the Lower Cretaceous Yixian Formation (China) is presented by Wang et al. (2024).
- A morphometric study of a large sample of specimens of Confuciusornis sanctus is published by Zhou et al. (2024), who interpret their findings as indicative of the presence of sexual dimorphism in this species.
- The fossil record of avialans from the Upper Cretaceous Maastricht Formation (Belgium and the Netherlands) is reviewed by Field et al. (2024), who additionally present new data on the bone histology and hindlimb length of Asteriornis maastrichtensis.
- Stoicescu et al. (2024) describe partial femur of an avialan belonging or related to the species Elopteryx nopcsai from the Maastrichtian strata at the Nălaț-Vad locality (Romania), interpret E. nopcsai as a probable secondarily flightless avialan, and argue that Balaur bondoc might be a junior synonym of E. nopcsai.
- A study the relationship between the morphology of cervical vertebrae and dietary modes in extant and extinct birds is published by Liu et al. (2024), who report that Bohaiornis, Brevirostruavis and Longipteryx had cervical morphologies resembling those of extant insectivorous or raptorial birds, while Yanornis and Iteravis had cervical morphologies closer to those of extant generalist or herbivorous birds, falling into the ecological niches of aquatic or semiaquatic birds.
- New information on the development of the skeletons of members of Enantiornithes throughout their ontogeny, based on the study of two early immature specimens from the Lower Cretaceous Jiufotang Formation (China), is presented by O'Connor et al. (2024).
- O'Connor et al. (2024) report the discovery of gymnosperm seeds within the abdominal cavities of two specimens of Longipteryx, providing evidence of frugivory of Longipteryx.
- A study aiming to determine the diets of members of the family Bohaiornithidae is published by Miller et al. (2024), who interpret their findings as indicating that the family included taxa adapted to diverse diets, and predict the ancestral member of Enantiornithes to have been a generalist which ate a wide variety of foods.
- A study on the limb bone histology and growth dynamics of Musivavis amabilis is published by Kundrát et al. (2024).
- The Cretaceous fossil record of avialans from Antarctica is reviewed by Acosta Hospitaleche et al. (2024).
- Álvarez-Herrera & Agnolín (2024) compare Maastrichtian bird assemblages from Santa Cruz Province, Argentina and from Antarctica, note that the asseblanges differ in composition (only members of Neornithes and kin are present in Antarctica, unlike in Argentina), and interpret those differences as possibly caused by accelerated growth and high metabolism of members of Neornithes compared to more basal birds.
- A study on the antiquity of the crown group of birds is published by Brocklehurst & Field (2024), who argue that the crown group originated between 110.5 and 90.3 million years ago, and that the majority of higher-order diversification within the crown group either spanned or postdated the Cretaceous-Paleogene transition.
- A study on patterns of avian molecular evolution is published by Berv et al. (2024), who interpret their findings as indicating that the Cretaceous–Paleogene extinction event influenced the evolution of bird genomes, physiology and life history traits that in turn influenced the diversification of modern birds.
- Widrig, Navalón & Field (2024) describe the external and internal morphology of the braincase of Lithornis vulturinus, interpret its neuroanatomy as likely similar to the neuroanatomy of the ancestral crown bird, and interpret L. vulturinus as a diurnal bird that likely was reliant on visual cues and had a well-developed sense of smell.
- The histochemistry of an ostrich eggshell from the Miocene Liushu Formation (China) is examined by Wu et al. (2024).
- Pickford, Russell & Day (2024) designate a lectotype for the oospecies Psammornis rothschildi.
- Schroeter (2024) presents a characterization of diagenetiforms in a moa proteome.
- Review of moa tracks and other traces is published by Hunt & Lucas (2024), who name new ichnotaxa Turanganuipus worthyi,Moapus tennysoni, Dinornipus oweni, Gisbornepus angustus, Tutaenuipus woodi and Aotearoapus lockleyorum.
- Pickford (2024) revises fossil eggshells from the Miocene strata from the Karingarab aeolianite succession (Namibia), originally described as Struthio karingarabensis, and transfers this oospecies to the genus Diamantornis.
- A draft genome of the little bush moa is presented by Edwards et al. (2024).
- Tomlinson et al. (2024) reconstruct the range and extinction dynamics of six species of moa, and interpret their findings as indicating that the studied species likely had similar spatial patterns of geographic range collapse, and that their final populations persisted in cold, mountainous areas that continue to function as sanctuaries for New Zealand's remaining flightless birds.
- Fossil material of a possible member of Galloanserae is described from the Upper Cretaceous (Maastrichtian) Lance Formation (Wyoming, United States) by Brownstein (2024), who interprets this finding as supporting a cosmopolitan distribution of early crown birds.
- Crane et al. (2024) reevaluate the anatomy of the mandible of Asteriornis maastrichtensis and find that no retroarticular process (a trait originally interpreted as supporting the placement of A. maastrichtensis within Galloanserae) is preserved in the holotype, which does not preserve the caudal extremities of the mandibles; however, the authors do not rule out the possibility that the studied bird originally had robust retroarticular processes comparable to those of extant members of Galloanserae, and their phylogenetic analysis supports the placement of Asteriornis within Galloanserae.
- Mayr et al. (2024) describe a new skull of a gastornithiform bird from Geiseltal (Germany) and assign it to the species Diatryma geiselensis, interpreted by the authors as distinctly different from Gastornis parisiensis, and advocate reestablishment of Diatryma as a genus distinct from Gastornis.
- McInerney, Blokland & Worthy (2024) redescribe the skull morphology of Genyornis newtoni and study its phylogenetic affinities, recovering the family Dromornithidae as more likely to be members of Anseriformes related to screamers than close relatives of the family Gastornithidae.
- A study on the vertebral column of Annakacygna hajimei is published by Matsuoka, Seoka & Hasegawa (2024), who reconstruct the neck of this bird with a curve at its base that increased the buoyancy and stability of the bird's body when it was in the water by helping it to put the base of the neck with its air sacs below the water surface.
- A case for the validity of Miotadorna catrionae is presented by Tennyson et al. (2024), in response to Worthy et al. (2022) considering it a junior synonym of Miotadorna sanctibathansi.
- Evidence from the study of mitogenomes of the extant Brazilian merganser and extinct Auckland Island merganser, interpreted as indicating that the studied mergansers are not sister taxa and that their ancestors moved into the Southern Hemisphere in two separate colonization events at least 7 million years ago, is presented by Rawlence et al. (2024).
- A study on the evolutionary history of neoavians, as indicated by genomic data, is published by Wu et al. (2024), who argue that the initial diversification of the crown group of birds was correlated with the rise of flowering plants in the Cretaceous, that modern birds survived the Cretaceous–Paleogene extinction event relatively well, and that the Paleocene–Eocene Thermal Maximum had a significant impact on the diversification of the seabirds; Claramunt et al. (2024) subsequently considered these results to be questionable, arguing that the study has problems with their choices of fossils and calibration strategy, while Wu et al. (2024) rejected these criticisms.
- A study on the impression of the skeleton of a small flamingo described from the late Cenozoic Pie de Vaca site (Mexico) is published by Galicia-Coleote, Cruz & Eduardo Corona-M (2024), who interpret the studied imprint as representing an adult flamingo different from known the American extant and extinct species, providing evidence of the presence of a group of small flamingos in the late Cenozoic of North America.
- Revision of the systematics and nomenclature of the dodo, the Rodrigues solitaire and the family-group nomina based upon them is published by Young et al. (2024), who name the new subtribe Raphina for the two taxa.
- Zelenkov (2024) describes a fragmentary humerus of a buttonquail from the Lower Pleistocene strata from the Taurida Cave (Crimea), representing the first record of a member of the family Turnicidae from Eurasia from the Pliocene to Middle Pleistocene interval.
- Goodman & Rasolonjatovo (2024) study the carpal spur of the Malagasy lapwing, find it to be larger than wing spurs of living lapwings, and interpret it as likely used for defence against predators.
- Abbassi et al. (2024) describe an assemblage of vertebrate footprints from the Oligocene Lower Red Formation (Iran), including footprints of small shorebirds and possible herons and storks.
- Mayr & Kitchener (2024) describe a tarsometatarsus and an associated pedal phalanx from the Eocene London Clay (United Kingdom), showing similarities to bones of frigatebirds and interpreted as possible fossil material of Marinavis longirostris.
- Guilherme et al. (2024) report the first discovery of the left tibiotarsus of Macranhinga ranzii from the Miocene Solimões Formation (Brazil), and estimate the body mass of the studied darter as ranging from 14.39 to 19.1 kg.
- Zelenkov et al. (2024) describe fossil material of a large marine bird from the Eocene Tavda Formation (Tyumen Oblast, Russia), interpreted as evidence of a worldwide distribution of stem albatrosses or similar large procellariiforms as early as the Eocene.
- A study on the internal structure and resistance to bending forces of tarsometatarsi of extant and Eocene penguins is published by Jadwiszczak, Krüger & Mörs (2024).
- A new specimen of Palaeeudyptes is described by Xia, Pei & Li (2024).
- A study on the long limb bone microstructure of extant king penguins throughout their ontogeny is published by Canoville, Robin & de Buffrénil (2024), who find evidence of substantial intraspecific variability regardless of the ontogenetic stage, and evidence indicating that limb bones of king penguins reach adult size early in the development while their microstructure continues to change until adulthood; on the basis of their findings the authors do not consider the conclusions of Cerda, Tambussi & Degrange (2014) and Ksepka et al. (2015) about the paleobiology of fossil penguins to be properly supported by their data.
- The evolutionary dynamics of microsatellites in Adélie penguins based on both modern and ancient genetic samples (up to 46.5 thousand years old) are studied by McComish et al. (2024).
- Torres Etchegorry & Degrange (2024) reconstruct endocast of Argentavis magnificens, and interpret its probable brain morphology as suggesting that Argentavis was a scavenger or even a kleptoparasitic bird, living in open areas without much vegetation.
- Leoni et al. (2024) describe the first fossil material of a turkey vulture from cave deposits in northeastern Brazil, which preserves trace marks likely produced by a felid and indicating that the vulture died in the cave it was discovered in.
- A study on the age of remains of California condors from the Mule Ears Peak Cave (Texas, United States) is published by Emslie (2024), who find evidence of the presence of condors at the studied site beginning at ~15,000 calendar years before present and evidence of definite nesting ~13,000 calendar years before present, reports evidence from stable isotope analysis of bone collagen interpreted as indicating that the studied condors fed on megafauna living in a desert grassland ecosystem, and interprets these findings as indicating that the disappearance of the California condor from the inland west of North America as related to the extinctions of megafauna the end of the Pleistocene.
- The colonization of the Mediterranean Basin by Bonelli's eagle is studied by Moleón et al. (2024), drawing on data from environmental favorability, genetic structure, the fossil record, and ecological relationships with golden eagles.
- Acosta Hospitaleche & Jones (2024) describe fossil material of a large-bodied (with an estimated body mass of around 100 kg) phorusrhacid or phorusrhacid-like bird from the Eocene La Meseta Formation (Seymour Island, Antarctica), interpreted by the authors as likely apex predator of Antarctica during the Eocene.
- A study on the phylogenetic relationships and on the evolution of body size and cursoriality in phorusrhacids, providing evidence of niche partitioning and competitive exclusion that controlled phorusrhacid diversity, is published by LaBarge, Gardner & Organ (2024).
- Acosta Hospitaleche & Jones (2024) describe partial tibiotarsus of a psilopterine phorusrhacid from the Eocene (Lutetian) Sarmiento Formation (Argentina), interpreted as belonging to a bird with an estimated body mass of approximately 5 kg.
- Partial tibiotarsus of an indeterminate phorusrhacid, possibly representing the largest member of the family reported to date, is described from the La Victoria Formation (Colombia) by Degrange et al. (2024).
- A carpometacarpus of a Cuban macaw is described from the Pleistocene of El Abrón Cave (Cuba) by Zelenkov (2024).
- A study on the phylogenetic relationships of Wieslochia weissi, Crosnoornis nargizia, Jamna szybiaki, Resoviaornis jamrozi and an unnamed passerine from the Oligocene of France described by Riamon, Tourment & Louchart (2020) is published by Lowi-Merri et al. (2024).
- De Pietri et al. (2024) report evidence of the presence of 10 and 17 passerine species in the Miocene St Bathans fauna (New Zealand), including a honeyeater larger than extant tui and a cracticid comparable in size to extant Australian magpie.
- Pöllath & Peters (2024) study the composition of early Holocene bird assemblages from southeast Turkey, northern Syria and northern Iraq, providing evidence of changes of bird species ranges related to climatic changes during the Pleistocene-Holocene transition, aridification during the Holocene and human activities.
- Evidence of disproportionate loss of global bird diversity resulting from extinction caused by human activities since the Late Pleistocene is presented by Matthews et al. (2024).

== Pterosaurs ==
=== New pterosaur taxa ===
Name	Novelty	Status	Authors	Age	Type locality	Country	Notes	Images
Akharhynchus	Gen. et sp. nov		Jacobs, Smith & Zouhri	Cretaceous (Albian-Cenomanian)	Ifezouane Formation	Morocco	A member of the family Ornithocheiridae. The type species is A. martilli.	
Ceoptera	Gen. et sp. nov	Valid	Martin-Silverstone et al.	Middle Jurassic	Kilmaluag Formation	United Kingdom	A darwinopteran. The type species is C. evansae.	
Haliskia	Gen. et sp. nov	Valid	Pentland et al.	Early Cretaceous (Albian)	Toolebuc Formation	Australia	A member of Anhangueria. The type species is H. peterseni.	
Inabtanin	Gen. et sp. nov		Rosenbach et al.	Late Cretaceous (Maastrichtian)	Muwaqqar Chalk Marl Formation	Jordan	A member of Azhdarchoidea. The type species is I. alarabia.	
Melkamter	Gen. et sp. nov	Valid	Fernandes, Pol & Rauhut	Early Jurassic	Cañadón Asfalto Formation	Argentina	A monofenestratan. The type species is M. pateko.	
Nipponopterus	Gen. et sp. nov		Zhou et al.	Late Cretaceous	Mifune Group	Japan	A member of the family Azhdarchidae. The type species is N. mifunensis.	
Propterodactylus	Gen. et sp. nov	Valid	Spindler	Late Jurassic	Painten Formation	Germany	A transitional monofenestratan. The type species is P. frankerlae.	
Skiphosoura	Gen. et sp. nov		Hone et al.	Late Jurassic	Mörnsheim Formation	Germany	A transitional pterodactyliform. The type species is S. bavarica.	
Torukjara	Gen. et sp. nov	Valid	Pêgas	Early Cretaceous	Caiuá Group	Brazil	A tapejarid. The type species is T. bandeirae.	

=== Pterosaur research ===
- A study on the morphological diversity of hands and feet of pterosaurs throughout their evolutionary history is published by Smyth et al. (2024), who find evidence of changes of the hand and foot morphologies that were related to the shift from climbing lifestyles of early pterosaurs to primarily terrestrial lifestyles with more ground-based locomotion of later, short-tailed pterosaurs in the Middle Jurassic.
- A study on the cervical osteology of Anhanguera piscator, Azhdarcho lancicollis and Rhamphorhynchus muensteri, aiming to reconstruct the cervical arthrology of pterosaurs and the position of the pterosaur neck at rest, is published by Buchmann & Rodrigues (2024).
- A study on the palate structure in Kunpengopterus, Hongshanopterus, Hamipterus and Dsungaripterus, providing new information on the relations between the palatine, ectopterygoid, maxilla and pterygoid in the studied pterosaurs resulting in reinterpretation of the main palatal openings, and identifying an opening bordered anteriorly by the maxilla and posteriorly by the palatine that is unique within Diapsida and might be a synapomorphy of Pterosauria, is published by Chen et al. (2024).
- A study aiming to determine the aerodynamic impact of large heads and head crests of pterosaurs is published by Henderson (2024).
- Schade & Ansorge (2024) describe a fragmentary bone from the lower Toarcian strata of the Grimmen Formation (Mecklenburg-Vorpommern, Germany), interpret as probable fused tibia and fibula of a pterosaur and the first record of a pterosaur from the studied strata.
- Yun (2024) uses geometric morphometric analyses to investigate the relationships of pterosaur specimens from the Early Cretaceous Jinju and Hasandong formations (South Korea), and suggests that the material likely cannot be assigned to the Boreopteridae, as had previously been assumed.
- Cooper, Smith & Martill (2024) study fossilized gut contents of specimens of Dorygnathus banthensis and Campylognathoides zitteli from the Posidonia Shale (Germany), reporting evidence of Dorygnathus feeding on fishes and evidence of Campylognathoides feeding on belemnites.
- Habib & Hone (2024) study the variation seen in elements and body parts of specimens of Rhamphorhynchus muensteri, providing evidence of high levels of constraint throughout the appendicular and axial elements that were likely important for flight, and evidence of increased variability of tails of larger individuals, possibly related to the signalling function of the tail.
- Evidence from the study of tail vanes of specimens of Rhamphorhynchus muensteri from the Solnhofen Limestone (Germany), providing evidence of the presence of thicker tube-like structures criss-crossing with thinner fibres, is presented by Jagielska et al. (2024), who interpret the studied structures as likely used to maintain stiffness of the tail vane during flight.
- So, Kim & Won (2024) describe a nearly complete skeleton of a probable member of the genus Jeholopterus from the Lower Cretaceous Sinuiju Formation, representing the first pterosaur recond from North Korea reported to date.
- An incomplete hollow bone (possibly an ulna) of a possible pterodactyloid pterosaur with an estimated 3.5–4 m wingspan is described from the Bajocian Greetwell Member of the Lincolnshire Limestone Formation (Rutland, United Kingdom) by Withers et al. (2024).
- Heredia et al. (2024) describe new tracks of pterodactyloid pterosaurs from the Cenomanian Candeleros Formation (Argentina) with a different morphology from previously recorded tracks from this formation, interpreted as more likely produced by individuals of different ages rather than different species.
- Smyth & Unwin (2024) interpret Pterodactylus antiquus and Diopecephalus kochi as distinct pterodactyloid taxa that were not closely related.
- Partial finger phalanx of a member of Ctenochasmatoidea with an estimated wingspan of at least 3 m, representing one of the first records of Jurassic pterodactyloids from the United Kingdom, is described from the Kimmeridge Clay of Abingdon, Oxfordshire by Etienne et al. (2024).
- Description of the anatomy of the ankle of Pterodaustro guinazui is published by Burlot et al. (2024).
- Redescription and a study on the affinities of Haopterus gracilis is published by Xu, Jiang & Wang (2024), who recover H. gracilis as a member of Istiodactyliformes.
- Hone et al. (2024) report that the fossil material assigned to Luchibang xingzhe is a composite including remains of two pterosaurs, restrict the holotype to the rostrum and anterior mandible and consider this fossil material to be sufficient to confirm that L. xingzhe was a valid istiodactylid taxon, and interpret the purported postcranial material of L. xingzhe as remains of an indeterminate member of Azhdarchomorpha.
- Ciaffi & Bellardini (2024) describe isolated teeth of indeterminate members of Ornithocheiriformes from the Lohan Cura Formation (Neuquén Province, Argentina), providing evidence of a more abundant and diversified ornithocheiriform fauna in the south of the Neuquén Basin (at least in the Albian) than previously known.
- A study evaluating the ability of different proposed take-off motions of pterosaurs to produce leverage during the launch phase, as indicated by tests using a musculoskeletal model based on an indeterminate ornithocheiraean pterosaur with a 5 m wingspan, is published by Griffin et al. (2024).
- Cadena, Atuesta-Ortiz & Wilson Mantilla (2024) describe pterosaur fossil material from the Valanginian Rosablanca Formation and the Barremian Paja Formation (Colombia), including fossil material of an Anhanguera-like specimen extending known fossil record of such pterosaurs into the earliest part of the Cretaceous.
- Redescription of the anatomy of the postcranial skeleton of Dsungaripterus weii is published by Song, Jiang & Wang (2024).
- Large pterosaur footprints, likely produced by Dsungaripterus weii, are described from the Lower Cretaceous strata from the Junggar Basin (Xinjiang, China) by Li et al. (2024), who name a new ichnotaxon Pteraichnus junggarensis and study the relationship between pes length and hip height in pterosaurs.
- Jung & Huh (2024) describe pterosaur tracks from the Turonian Jangdong Formation (South Korea), interpreted as likely produced by small-bodied or immature azhdarchids and as probable evidence of gregariousness of the trackmakers.

== Other archosaurs ==
=== Other new archosaur taxa ===
Name	Novelty	Status	Authors	Age	Type locality	Country	Notes	Images
Amanasaurus	Gen. et sp. nov	Valid	Müller & Garcia	Late Triassic (Carnian)	Candelária Sequence of the Santa Maria Supersequence	Brazil	A member of the family Silesauridae. The type species is A. nesbitti. Announced in 2023; the final article version was published in 2024.	
Gondwanax	Gen. et sp. nov	Valid	Müller	Middle–Late Triassic (Ladinian–early Carnian)	Pinheiros-Chiniquá Sequence of the Santa Maria Supersequence	Brazil	A sulcimentisaurian member of the possibly paraphyletic family Silesauridae. The type species is G. paraisensis. Announced in 2024; the final article version was published in 2025.	

=== Other archosaur research ===
- Garcia et al. (2024) describe two new lagerpetid specimens from the Carnian strata of the upper Santa Maria Formation (Brazil), interpreted as indicative of a sympatric occurrence of lagerpetids representing different morphotypes.
- Agnolín et al. (2024) revise the anatomy of the pelvic girdle of Lagerpeton chanarensis, reinterpreting it as likely to have a sprawling gait.
- A study on the anatomy of the skeleton and musculature of the hindlimbs of Lagosuchus talampayensis is published by Otero, Bishop & Hutchinson (2024), who find that the fossil material of L. talampayensis is curated with skeletal elements of members of other taxa, and estimate moment-generating capacities of reconstructed musculature.

== General research ==
- A study on the evolution of locomotion in archosauromorph reptiles is published by Shipley et al. (2024), who interpret their findings as indicative of greater range in limb form and locomotor modes of dinosaurs compared to other archosauromorph groups, and argue that the ability to adopt a wider variety of limb forms and modes might have given dinosaurs a competitive advantage over pseudosuchians.
- A study on the body size evolution of non-avian dinosaurs and Mesozoic birds is published by Wilson et al. (2024), who find no evidence that Bergmann's rule applied to the studied taxa.
- Knoll, Ishikawa & Kawabe (2024) present a new method which can be used to determine the brain volume of extinct archosaurs on the basis their endocranial cavity volume.
- Malafaia et al. (2024) revise fossils from Portugal that were historically assigned to Megalosaurus, and find that the majority of this fossil material represents bones of members of different theropod groups, but also that the studied material includes stegosaurian, iguanodontian, sauropod and thalattosuchian bones.
- Dinosaur and probable crocodylomorph tracks, including some of the largest sauropod tracks worldwide, are described from the Bathonian strata in the El Mers area (Morocco) by Amzil et al. (2024).
- MacLennan et al. (2024) interpret exceptional preservation of fossils (including early birds and feathered non-avian dinosaurs) from the Lower Cretaceous Yixian Formation (China) as unlikely to be linked to violent volcanic eruptions.
