= Caletodraco =

Caletodraco Temporal range: Late Cretaceous, lower Cenomanian
- Reconstructed skeleton

Scientific classification
- Kingdom: Animalia
- Phylum: Chordata
- Class: Reptilia
- Clade: Dinosauria
- Clade: Saurischia
- Clade: Theropoda
- Family: †Abelisauridae
- Clade: †Furileusauria
- Genus: †Caletodraco; Buffetaut et al., 2024

Type species
- †Caletodraco cottardi Buffetaut et al., 2024

Genus of abelisaurid dinosaurs

Caletodraco is a genus of furileusaurian abelisaurid dinosaur from Late Cretaceous (Cenomanian) Chalk of the Pays de Caux, France. The type species is Caletodraco cottardi. It represents the first definitive furileusaurian named from outside of South America.

== Discovery and naming ==
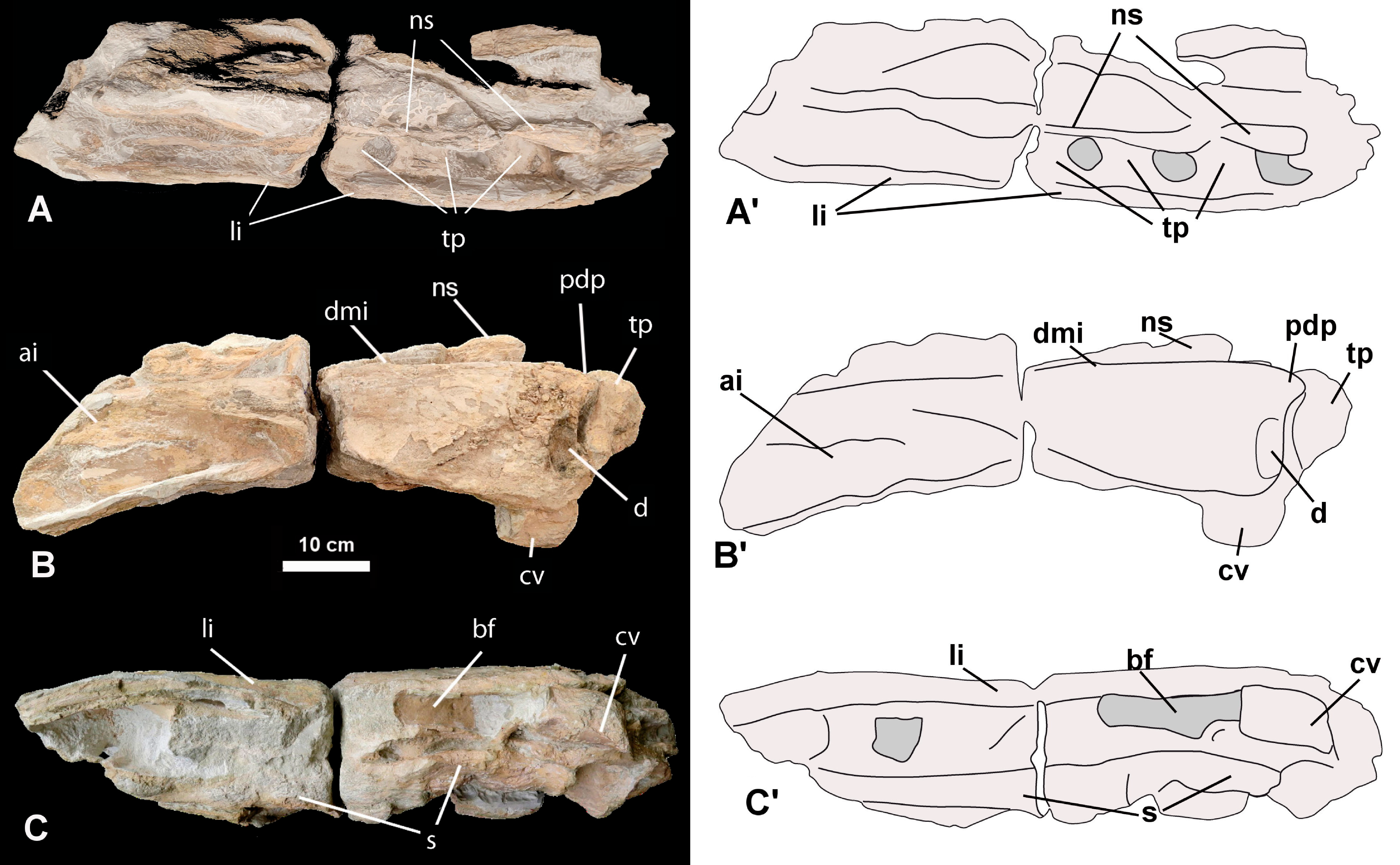
Holotype

The holotype specimen, MHNH 2024.1.1., was collected by Nicolas Cottard during two separate expeditions in 2021 and 2023, and it includes a sacrum, incomplete ilia, the first caudal vertebra, and various poorly preserved bones, possibly ribs. A tooth found at the same locality may belong to the same taxon or a predator or scavenger.

Caletodraco was described as a new genus and species of abelisaurid in 2024. The generic name, Caletodraco, combines the name of the Caleti, the Celtic tribe that lived in the area around the type locality in Normandy, France, with the Latin draco, meaning "dragon". The specific name, honors Nicolas Cottard, who discovered the specimen and donated it to the museum where it is now reposited.

== Description ==
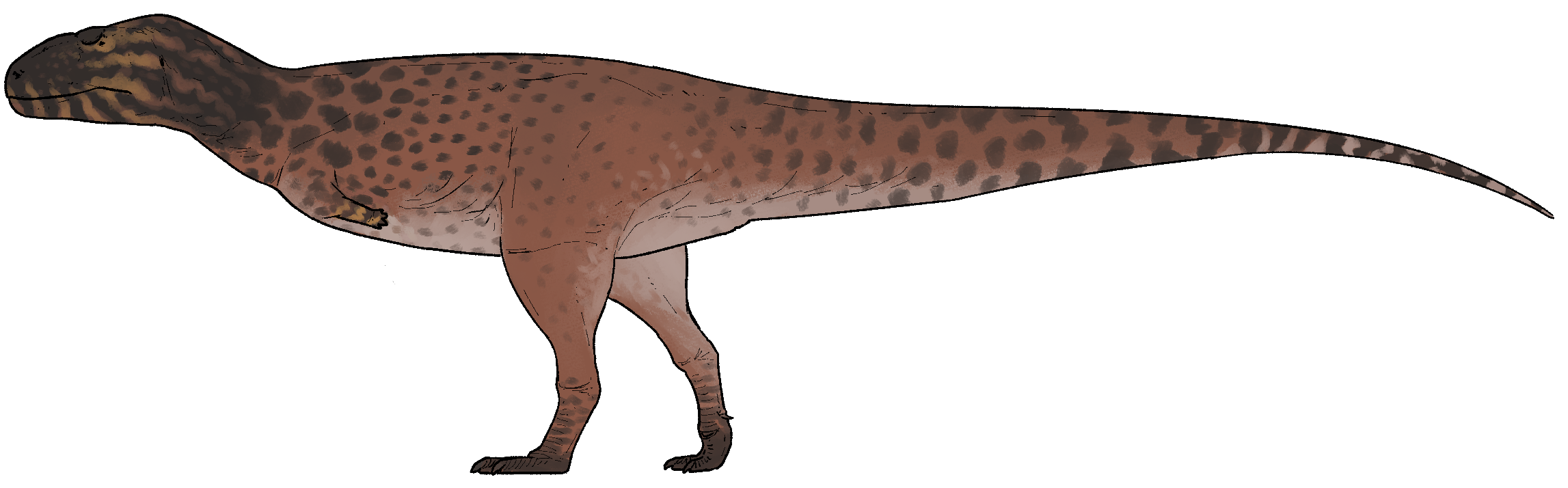
Life restoration

The Caletodraco holotype is similar in general size to the corresponding bones of Skorpiovenator. The ilia of both taxa measures around 70 centimetres (28 in), with the length of the first caudal vertebral centra at about 10 centimetres (3.9 in). As Skorpiovenator is known from a fairly complete skeleton with an estimated total length of 6 metres (20 ft), it can be assumed that Caletodraco was similar in size. The shape of the transverse process on the caudal vertebra is an autapomorphy that distinguishes Caletodraco from all other abelisaurids.

== Classification ==
Caletodraco was assigned by its describers to the abelisaurid subclade Furileusauria. This makes it one of the oldest known furileusaurians, possibly along with Genusaurus from the Early Cretaceous of France. This suggests a more complex biogeography of European abelisaurs than previously assumed.
