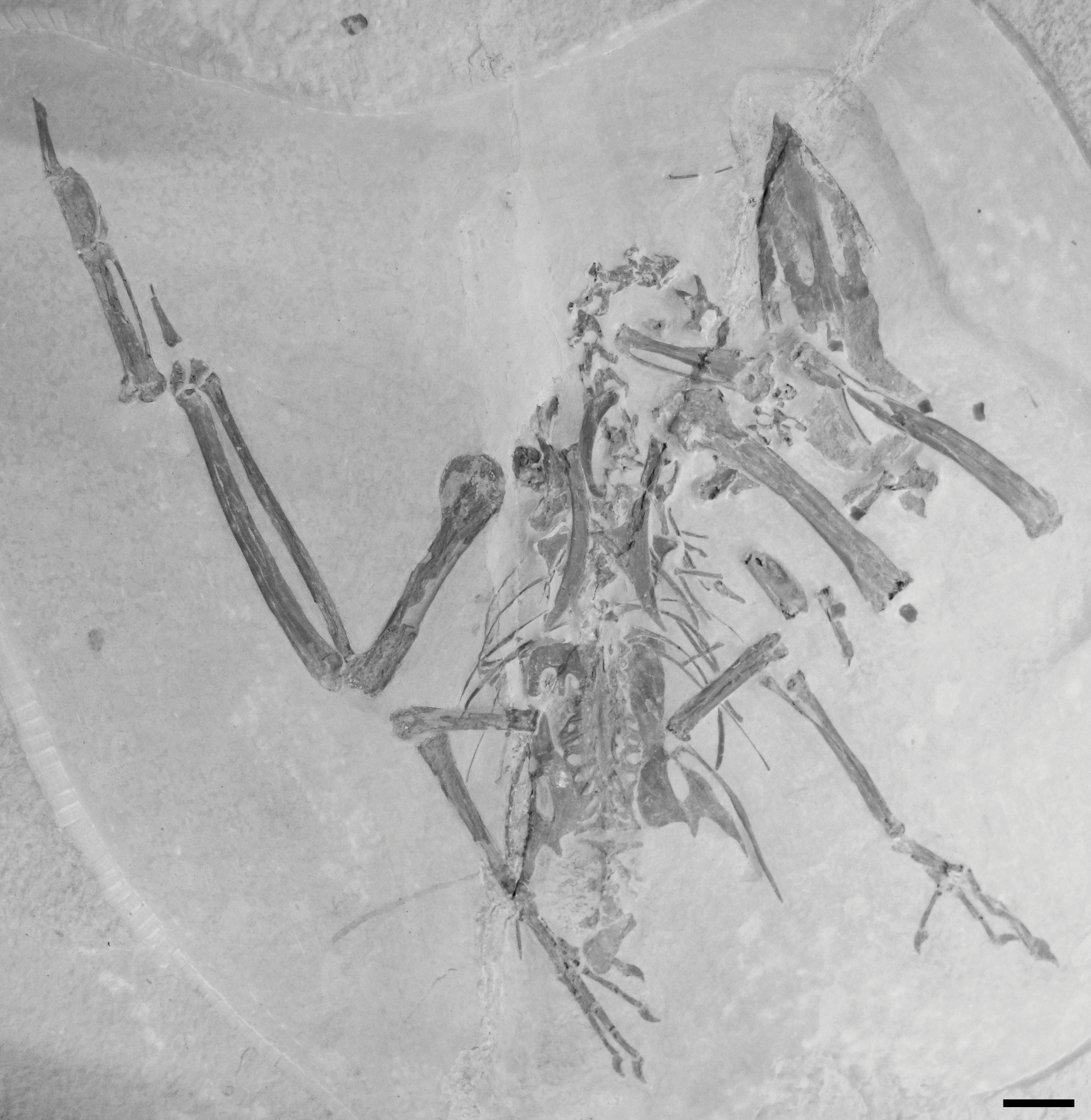
- Holotype of F. platyrhamphus

Scientific classification
- Kingdom: Animalia
- Phylum: Chordata
- Class: Aves
- Family: †Fluvioviridavidae; Mayr, 2005
- Genus: †Fluvioviridavis; Mayr & Daniels, 2001

Type species
- †Fluvioviridavis platyrhamphus Mayr & Daniels, 2001

Other species
- †F. michaeldanielsi Mayr & Kitchener, 2024; †F. nazensis Mayr & Kitchener, 2024

= Fluvioviridavis =

Fluvioviridavis Temporal range: Early Eocene, (Ypresian)

Extinct genus of birds

Fluvioviridavis is an extinct genus of bird from the Early Eocene Green River Formation of Wyoming (United States) and London Clay Formation of the United Kingdom. There are three known species: F. platyrhamphus from the Green River and F. michaeldanielsi and F. nazensis from the London Clay. Fluvioviridavis is the only genus currently named in the monotypic family Fluvioviridavidae.

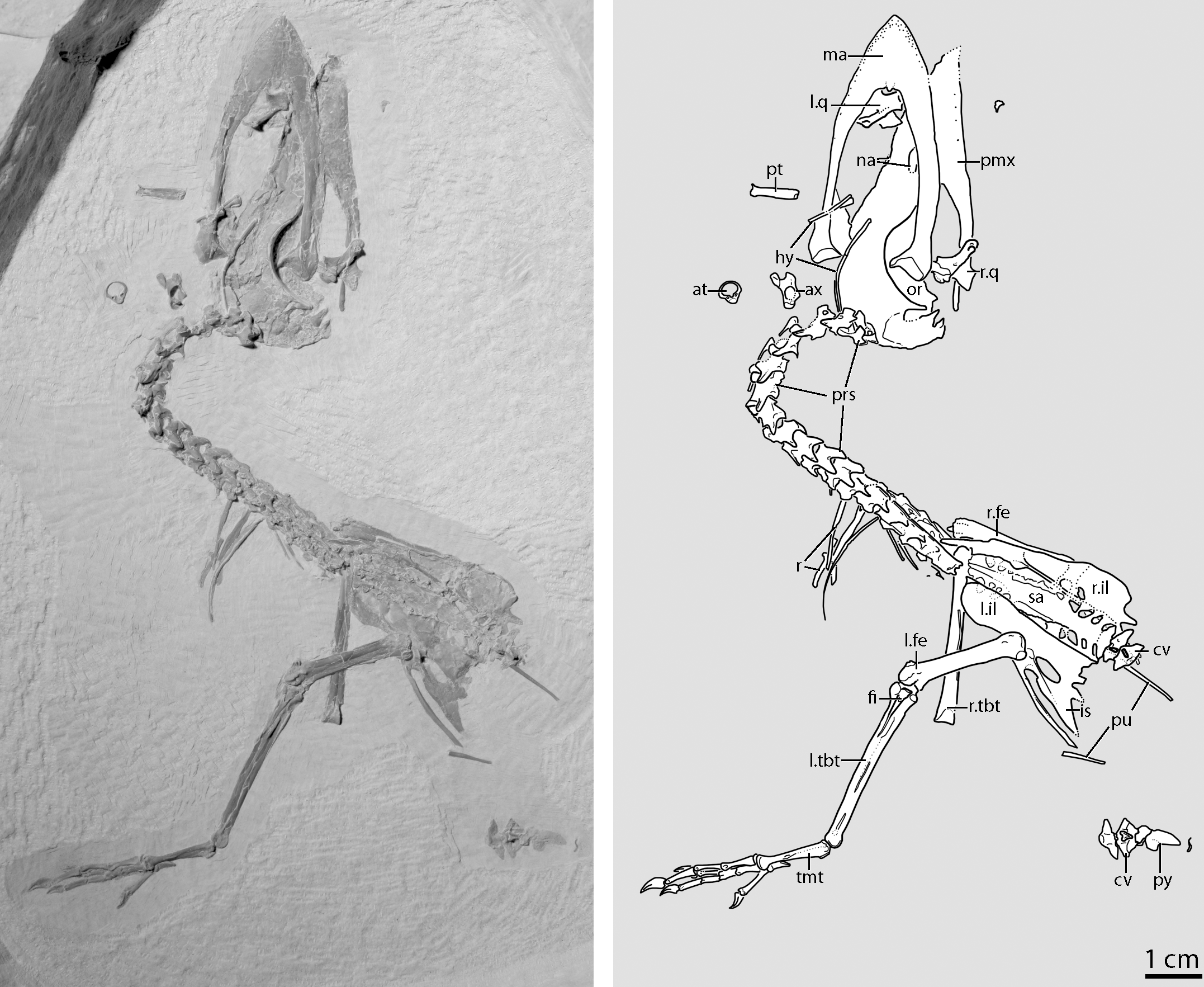
Second known specimen of F. platyrhamphus
