= Chalk of the Pays de Caux =

Geologic locality in France

- Stratigraphic range: Late Cretaceous, lower Cenomanian
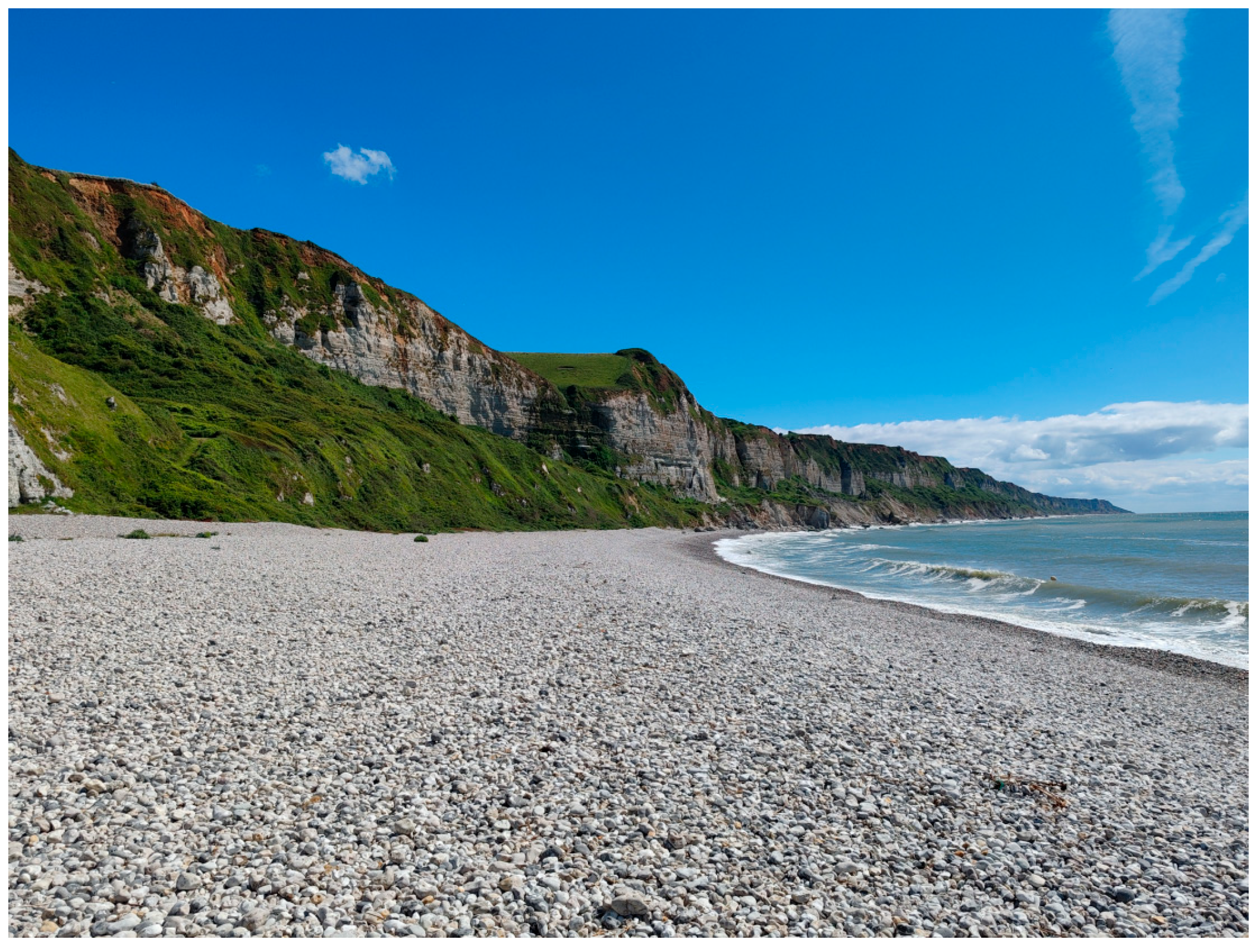
- The Chalk of the Pays de Caux outcropping at Saint-Jouin-Bruneval
- Type: Geological formation
- Sub-units: Several ammonite subunits, including: Mantelliceras mantelli zone (=Neostlingoceras carcitanense, Sharpeiceras schlueteri, and Mantelliceras saxbii zones); Mantelliceras dixoni zone; Cunningtoniceras inerme zone; Acanthoceras rhotomagense zone (=Turrilites costatus and Turrilites acutus zones); Acanthoceras jukesbrownei zone; Calycoceras naviculare zone; Metoicoceras geslianum zone; Neocardioceras juddii zone
- Underlies: Watinoceras devonense zone
- Overlies: Surface rav. Octeville

Lithology
- Primary: Glauconitic chalk

Location
- Coordinates: 43°22′05″N 1°59′26″E
- Region: Normandy
- Country: France
- Extent: Pays de Caux
- Chalk of the Pays de Caux (France)

The Chalk of the Pays de Caux is a geologic locality dating to the Late Cretaceous (lower Cenomanian age), outcropping in the Pays de Caux region of France. Dinosaur and reptile fossils are among the known remains found in the Chalk of the Pays de Caux.

== Paleobiota ==
Ammonite and fish fossils are known from this locality.

Genus	Species	Location	Stratigraphic position	Material	Notes	Image
Abelisauridae	Indeterminate	Saint-Jouin-Bruneval	C3 (Mantelliceras dixoni zon)	An isolated tooth	May belong to Caletodraco, or a taxon that predated or scavenged it	
Caletodraco	C. cottardi	Saint-Jouin-Bruneval	C3 (Mantelliceras dixoni zone)	The sacrum, partial ilia, the first caudal vertebra, and various fragmentary bones, possibly ribs		
Crocodilia	Indeterminate			Scant remains		
Ichthyosauria	Indeterminate			Scant remains		
?Lamniformes	Indeterminate	Saint-Jouin-Bruneval	C3 (Mantelliceras dixoni zone)	A single tooth	Discovered alongside the holotype of Caletodraco	
