= Mezdren Formation =

- Stratigraphic range: Campanian
- Type: Geological formation
- Unit of: Eastern Fore-Balkan Zone
- Underlies: Kaylaka Formation

Lithology
- Primary: Limestone

Location
- Coordinates: 43.15°N 26.53°E
- Region: Shumen Province
- Country: Bulgaria
- Extent: Bisserna Cave
- Mezdren Formation (Bulgaria)

The Mezdren Formation is a Late Cretaceous (Campanian) geologic formation located within Bisserna Cave, Shumen, Bulgaria.
