= Kaylaka Formation =

Geological formation in Bulgaria

- Stratigraphic range: Maastrichtian
- Type: Geological formation
- Unit of: Eastern Fore-Balkan Zone
- Underlies: Kamendel Formation
- Overlies: Mezdren Formation and Dobrina Formation

Lithology
- Primary: Limestone

Location
- Coordinates: 43.15°N 26.53°E
- Region: Shumen Province and Vratsa Province
- Country: Bulgaria
- Extent: Bisserna Cave and Labirinta Cave
- Kaylaka Formation (Bulgaria)

The Kaylaka Formation, also known as the Kajlâka Formation, is a Late Cretaceous (Maastrichtian) geologic formation located within Bisserna Cave, Shumen, and Labirinta Cave, Vratsa Province, both in Bulgaria.

== History ==
The first fossils found in the Kaylaka Formation were discovered in 1985 and were described in 2006.

The hadrosauroid specimen discovered in 1985 was described in 2024.

== Paleofauna ==
- Anapachydiscus (Menuites) cf. terminus
- Anomotodon sp.
- Elasmosauridae? indet.
- Hadrosauroidea indet.
- Hemipneustes striatoradiatus
- Hoploscaphites constrictus
- Mosasauridae indet.
- Mosasaurus cf. hoffmanni
- Squalicorax pristodontus

== See also ==
- List of dinosaur-bearing rock formations
  - List of stratigraphic units with few dinosaur genera
