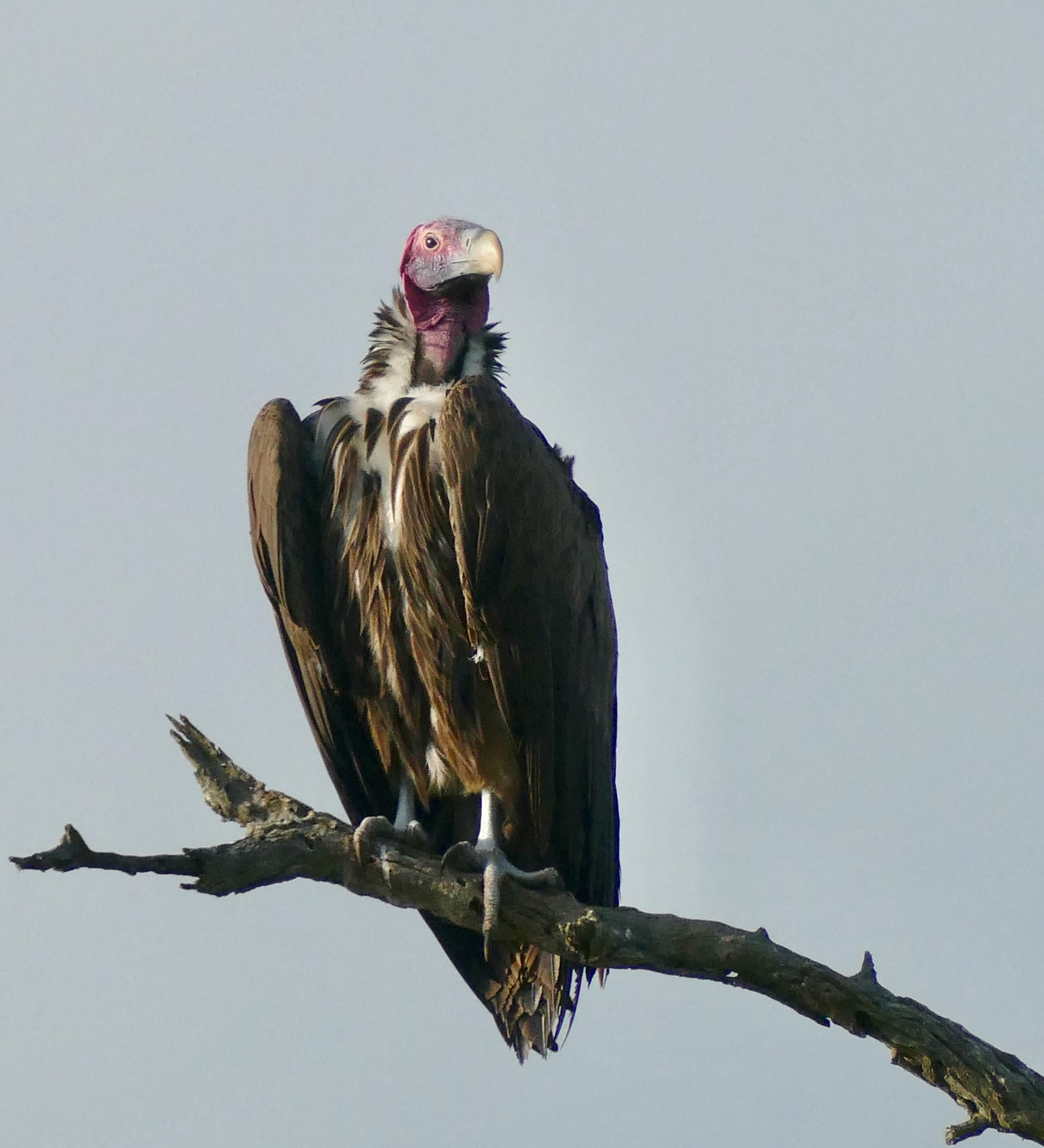
- Lappet-faced vulture (Torgos tracheliotos)

Scientific classification
- Kingdom: Animalia
- Phylum: Chordata
- Class: Aves
- Order: Accipitriformes
- Family: Accipitridae
- Subfamily: Aegypiinae
- Genus: Torgos; Kaup, 1828

Species
- Torgos tracheliotos (Forster, 1796); †Torgos platycephalus Gorbatcheva et Zelenkov, 2024

= Torgos =

Torgos Temporal range: Pleistocene - Recent

Genus of birds

Torgos is a genus of Old World vulture that contains two species, an extant species, the lappet-faced vulture (Torgos tracheliotos) and the fossil species Torgos platycephalus from the late Pleistocene of Azerbaijan and an unnamed fossil species from middle Pleistocene China.
