= Phalacrocorax bakonyiensis =

Phalacrocorax bakonyiensis Temporal range: Miocene

Scientific classification
- Kingdom: Animalia
- Phylum: Chordata
- Class: Aves
- Order: Suliformes
- Family: Phalacrocoracidae
- Genus: Phalacrocorax
- Species: †P. bakonyiensis

Binomial name
- †Phalacrocorax bakonyiensis Horváth et al., 2024

Extinct species of bird

Phalacrocorax bakonyiensis is an extinct species of Phalacrocorax that inhabited Hungary during the Miocene epoch.
