= Lumbrerornis =

Lumbrerornis Temporal range: Lutetian

Scientific classification
- Kingdom: Animalia
- Phylum: Chordata
- Class: Aves
- Genus: Lumbrerornis
- Species: L. rougieri

Binomial name
- Lumbrerornis rougieri Bertelli et al., 2024

Extinct genus of birds

Lumbrerornis is an extinct genus of bird that lived in Argentina during the Lutetian stage of the Eocene epoch. It contains a single species, L. rougieri.
