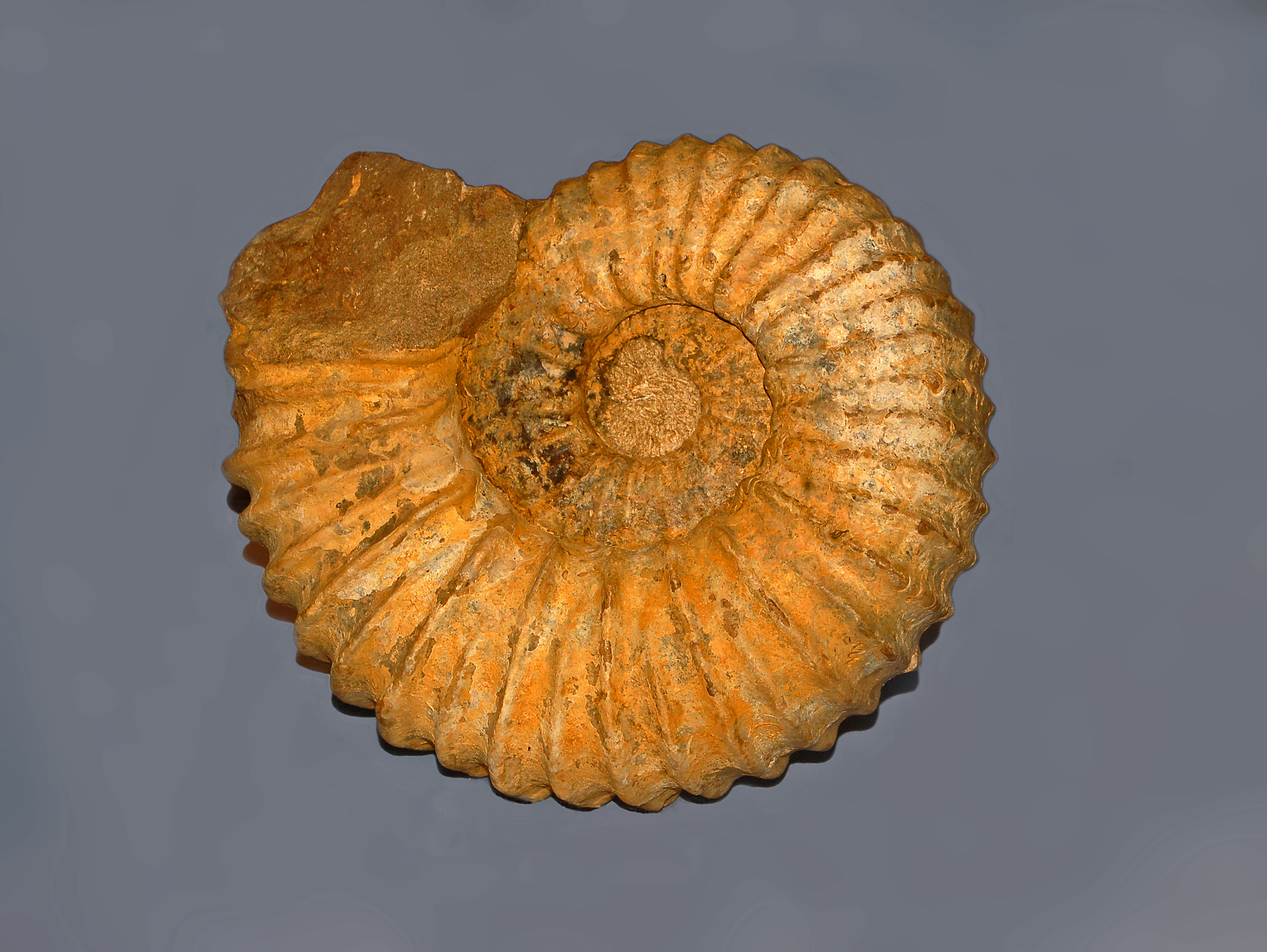
- Mantelliceras tuberculatum; Cenomanian; Madagascar

Scientific classification
- Kingdom: Animalia
- Phylum: Mollusca
- Class: Cephalopoda
- Subclass: †Ammonoidea
- Order: †Ammonitida
- Family: †Acanthoceratidae
- Subfamily: †Mantelliceratinae
- Genus: †Mantelliceras; Hyatt, 1903

= Mantelliceras =

Mantelliceras Temporal range: Late Cretaceous, 105.3–84.9 Ma

Mantelliceras is an extinct ammonoid cephalopod genus belonging to the family Acanthoceratidae and type for the subfamily Mantelliceratinae, that lived from the Late Albian to the late Cenomanian stage of the Late Cretaceous.

== Description ==
Mantelliceras is characterized by a strongly ribbed, moderately involute shell with a moderately wide umbilicus, and rounded whorl section. The final whorl leaves inner whorls partly exposed. High standing ribs cross over the venter smoothly. Primary ribs arise from the umbilical wall. Secondaries, usually one per intervening space, arise higher on the flanks. Species of Mantelliceras are known to reach a diameter of about 13 centimeters.

== Distribution ==
Species of Mantelliceras' have been found in Cretaceous sediments in Angola, France, Germany, Japan, Mexico, Russia, Spain, the United Kingdom, and United States.

== Species ==
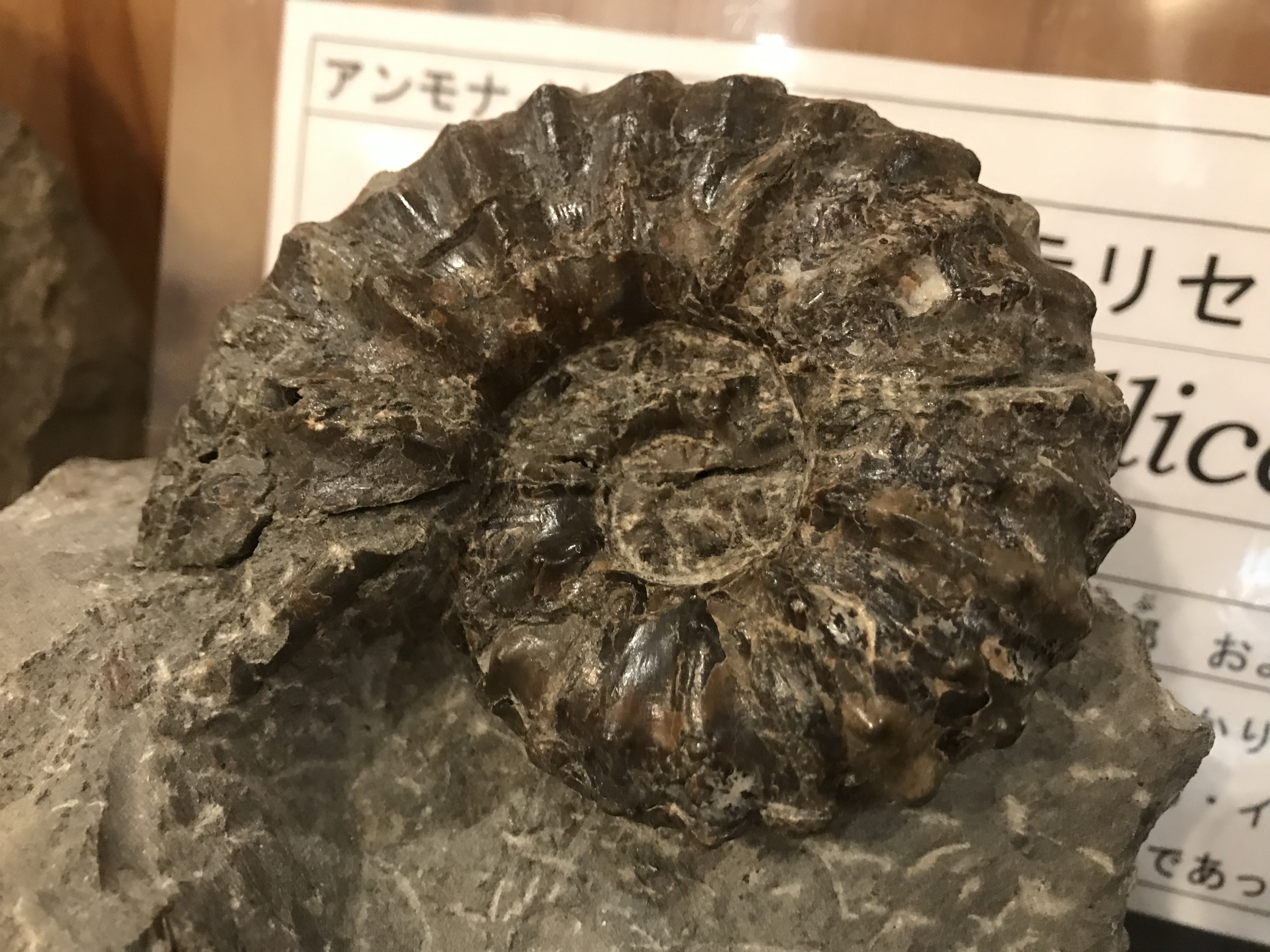
Mantericeras japonicum from Hokkaido

Species of Manatelliceras include:

- M. brazoense Böse, 1928
- M. cantianum Spath, 1926
- M. charlestoni Kellum & Mintz, 1962
- M. corroyi Fabre, 1940
- M. couloni (Orbigny, 1850)
- M. dixoni Spath, 1926
- M. japonicum Matsumoto, Muramoto & Takahashi, 1969
- M. lymense Spath, 1926
- M. mantelli Sowerby, 1814
- M. picteti Hyatt, 1903
- M. portalesi Kellum & Mintz, 1962
- M. saxbii Sharpe, 1857
- M. wacoense Böse, 1928
