= Pterodroma zinorum =

Pterodroma zinorum Temporal range: Quaternary

Scientific classification
- Kingdom: Animalia
- Phylum: Chordata
- Class: Aves
- Order: Procellariiformes
- Family: Procellariidae
- Genus: Pterodroma
- Species: †P. zinorum

Binomial name
- †Pterodroma zinorum Rando et al., 2024

Extinct species of bird

Pterodroma zinorum is an extinct species of Pterodroma that inhabited the Azores Archipelago during the Quaternary period. Radiocarbon dating indicates it survived until at least the 12th century and potentially up to the 17th century, which would mean it overlapped with early Portuguese colonisation of the archipelago.
