= Coturnix augustus =

Coturnix augustus Temporal range: Pliocene

Scientific classification
- Domain: Eukaryota
- Kingdom: Animalia
- Phylum: Chordata
- Class: Aves
- Order: Galliformes
- Family: Phasianidae
- Genus: Coturnix
- Species: †C. augustus

Binomial name
- †Coturnix augustus Zelenkov, 2024

Extinct species of Coturnix

Coturnix augustus is an extinct species of Coturnix that lived in Mongolia during the Pliocene epoch.
