= Xenavicula =

Xenavicula Temporal range: Ypresian

Scientific classification
- Kingdom: Animalia
- Phylum: Chordata
- Class: Aves
- Genus: †Xenavicula
- Species: †X. pamelae

Binomial name
- †Xenavicula pamelae Mayr & Kitchener, 2024

Extinct genus of birds

Xenavicula is an extinct genus of bird that lived during the Ypresian stage of the Eocene epoch.

== Distribution ==
Xenavicula pamelae fossils are known from the Walton Member of the London Clay Formation.
