= Uyrekura =

Uyrekura Temporal range: Early Oligocene

Scientific classification
- Kingdom: Animalia
- Phylum: Chordata
- Class: Aves
- Order: Anseriformes
- Family: Anatidae
- Genus: †Uyrekura
- Species: †U. chalkarica

Binomial name
- †Uyrekura chalkarica Zelenkov, 2023

Extinct genus of birds

Uyrekura is an extinct genus of anatid that lived during the Rupelian stage of the Oligocene epoch.

== Distribution ==
Uyrekura chalkarica is known from the Chelkarnura Formation of Kazakhstan.
