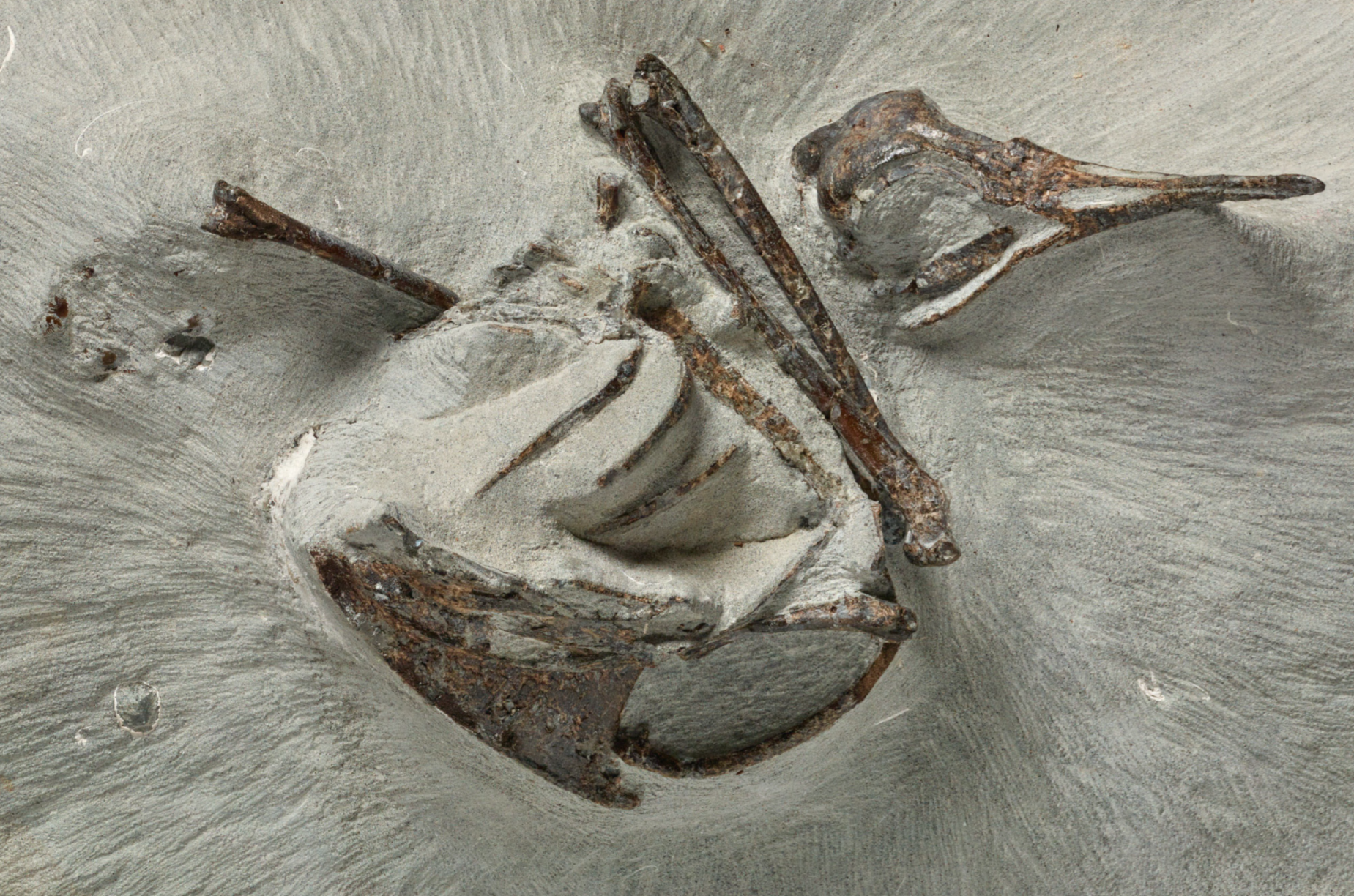

Scientific classification
- Kingdom: Animalia
- Phylum: Chordata
- Class: Aves
- Order: Procellariiformes
- Family: Procellariidae
- Genus: Ardenna
- Species: †A. buchananbrowni

Binomial name
- †Ardenna buchananbrowni Tennyson et al., 2024

= Ardenna buchananbrowni =

Ardenna buchananbrowni Temporal range: Piacenzian

Extinct species of Ardenna

Ardenna buchananbrowni is an extinct species of Ardenna that lived in New Zealand during the Piacenzian stage.
