= Sulcitarsus =

Sulcitarsus Temporal range: Ypresian

Scientific classification
- Kingdom: Animalia
- Phylum: Chordata
- Class: Aves
- Genus: †Sulcitarsus
- Species: †S. aenigmatus

Binomial name
- †Sulcitarsus aenigmatus Mayr & Kitchener, 2024

Extinct genus of birds

Sulcitarsus is an extinct genus of bird that lived during the Ypresian stage of the Eocene epoch.

== Distribution ==
Sulcitarsus aenigmatus is known from the Walton Member of the London Clay Formation.
