= Torgos platycephalus =

Torgos platycephalus Temporal range: Pleistocene

Scientific classification
- Domain: Eukaryota
- Kingdom: Animalia
- Phylum: Chordata
- Class: Aves
- Order: Accipitriformes
- Family: Accipitridae
- Genus: Torgos
- Species: †T. platycephalus

Binomial name
- †Torgos platycephalus Gorbatcheva & Zelenkov, 2024

Extinct species of bird

Torgos platycephalus is an extinct species of Torgos that lived in Azerbaijan during the Pleistocene epoch.
