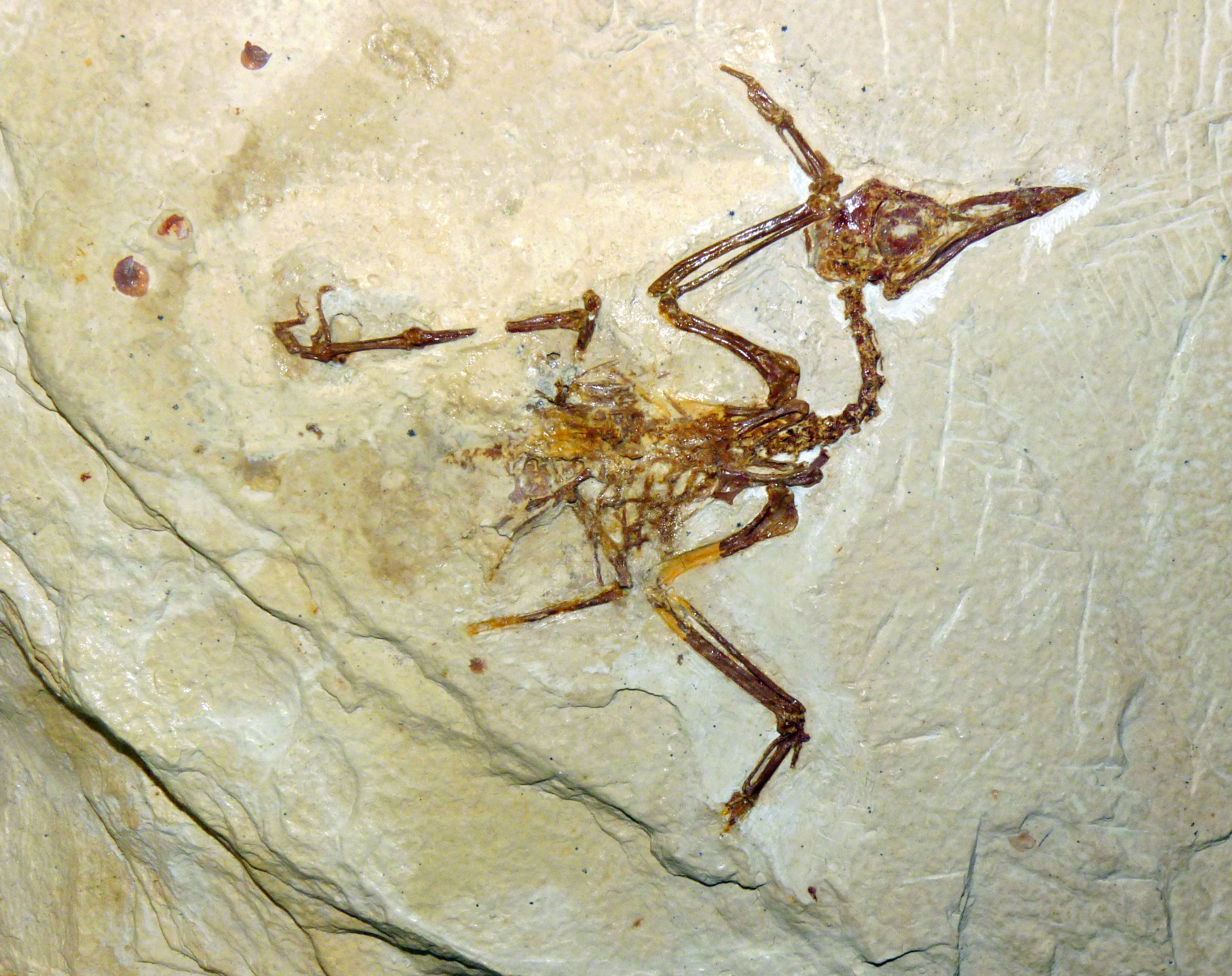
- P. kistneri USNM 336268

Scientific classification
- Kingdom: Animalia
- Phylum: Chordata
- Class: Aves
- Clade: Picodynastornithes
- Order: Piciformes
- Genus: †Pristineanis; Mayr & Kitchener 2024

Type species
- †Pristineanis minor Mayr & Kitchener 2024

= Pristineanis =

Pristineanis Temporal range: Early Eocene

Extinct genus of birds

Pristeanis is an extinct genus of piciform bird known from the Early Eocene. The genus contains three species. Pristineanis minor and Pristineanis major are known from the London Clay in the United Kingdom, while Pristeanis kistneri is known from the Green River Formation in the United States.

The holotype of Pristeanis, NMS.Z.2021.40.157 is a partial skeleton collected by amateur Michael Daniels from the Walton Member of the London Clay formation in 1984. This specimen was described as Pristeanis minor in 2024 by Gerald Mayr and Andrew Kitchener. Also referred to Pristineanis was NMS.Z.2021.40.158, a partial tarsometatarsus and pedal phalanx, described as Pristineanis major due to its 10% larger size in comparison to the Pristineanis minor holotype. The American species Pristeanis kistneri was originally described in 1973 as a possible piciform as Primobucco kistneri by Alan Feduccia; its holotype consists of a crushed partial skeleton. A subsequent, more complete specimen showed "N. kistneri" to differ from Neanis schucherti in having an elongate humerus, resulting in reassignment to the genus Pristineanis.

The fossilised feet of Pristeanis indicate that the genus possessed at least semi-zygodactyl feet. In general, the features of the leg bones in Pristineanis show affinity to those of the Piciformes.
