= Miochelidon =

Miochelidon Temporal range: Miocene

Scientific classification
- Kingdom: Animalia
- Phylum: Chordata
- Class: Aves
- Order: Passeriformes
- Family: Hirundinidae
- Genus: †Miochelidon; Volkova, 2024

Type species
- Miochelidon eschata

Extinct genus of birds

Miochelidon is an extinct genus of swallow described from fossils found in the Tagay Formation of Siberia. It contains a single species, M. eschata.
