= Bambusicola wenzensis =

Bambusicola wenzensis Temporal range: Pliocene

Scientific classification
- Kingdom: Animalia
- Phylum: Chordata
- Class: Aves
- Order: Galliformes
- Family: Phasianidae
- Genus: Bambusicola
- Species: †B. wenzensis

Binomial name
- †Bambusicola wenzensis Zelenkov, 2024

Extinct species of Bambusicola

Bambusicola wenzensis is an extinct species of Bambusicola known to have inhabited Poland during the Pliocene epoch.
