= Ukugyps =

Ukugyps Temporal range: Pleistocene

Scientific classification
- Kingdom: Animalia
- Phylum: Chordata
- Class: Aves
- Order: Accipitriformes
- Family: Cathartidae
- Genus: †Ukugyps
- Species: †U. orcesi

Binomial name
- †Ukugyps orcesi Lo Coco et al., 2024

Extinct genus of New World vultures

Ukugyps is an extinct genus of vulture from the family of cathartids, with a single species that lived during the Pleistocene epoch in what is today South America in Ecuador.

== Distribution ==
Ukugyps orcesi It is distributed only in Ecuador.
