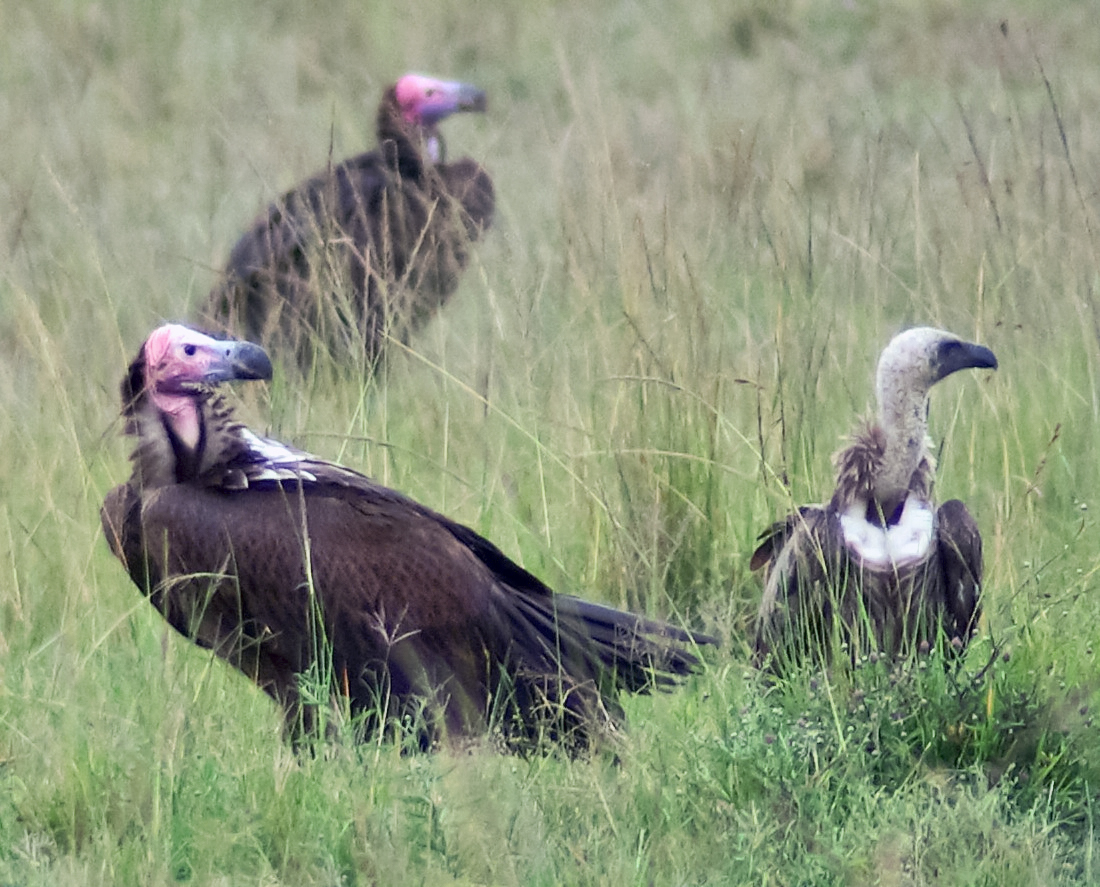
- Lappet-faced vultures (left) and a white-backed vulture

Scientific classification
- Kingdom: Animalia
- Phylum: Chordata
- Class: Aves
- Order: Accipitriformes
- Family: Accipitridae
- Subfamily: Aegypiinae; Sclater, WL, 1924

Type genus
- Aegypius Savigny, 1809

= Aegypiinae =

Subfamily of birds

Aegypiinae is one of two subfamilies of Accipitridae that are referred to as Old World vultures, the other being the Gypaetinae. They are not closely related to the Gypaetinae, and are instead a sister group to the serpent-eagles (Circaetinae).

Presently found throughout much of Africa, Asia, and parts of Europe, fossil evidence indicates that as recently as the Late Pleistocene, they ranged into Australia.

== Taxonomy ==
The subfamily Aegypiinae was introduced (as the family Aegypiidae) in 1924 by the British zoologist William Lutley Sclater with Aegypius Savigny, 1809, as the type genus.

The cladogram of the Aegypiinae shown below is based on a molecular phylogenetic study of the Accipitridae by Therese Catanach and collaborators that was published in 2024.

- Aegypiinae
  - - Necrosyrtes – hooded vulture
    - Gyps – vultures (8 species)
  - - Sarcogyps – red-headed vulture
    - - Trigonoceps – white-headed vulture
      - - Torgos – lappet-faced vulture
        - Aegypius – cinereous vulture

=== Genera ===
Genus	Common and binomial names	Image	Range
Necrosyrtes Gloger, 1841	Hooded vulture Necrosyrtes monachus		Sub-Saharan Africa
Gyps Savigny, 1809	Griffon vulture Gyps fulvus		Mountains in southern Europe, north Africa and Asia
Gyps Savigny, 1809	White-rumped vulture Gyps bengalensis		Northern and central India, Pakistan, Nepal, Bangladesh and southeast Asia
Gyps Savigny, 1809	Rüppell's vulture Gyps rueppelli		The Sahel region of central Africa
Gyps Savigny, 1809	Indian vulture Gyps indicus		Central and peninsular India
Gyps Savigny, 1809	Slender-billed vulture Gyps tenuirostris		The Sub-Himalayan regions of India and into Southeast Asia
Gyps Savigny, 1809	Himalayan vulture Gyps himalayensis		The Himalayas and Tibetan Plateau
Gyps Savigny, 1809	White-backed vulture Gyps africanus		Savannahs of west and east Africa
Gyps Savigny, 1809	Cape vulture Gyps coprotheres		Southern Africa
Sarcogyps Lesson, 1842	Red-headed vulture Sarcogyps calvus		The Indian subcontinent, with small disjunct populations in Southeast Asia
Trigonoceps Lesson, 1842	White-headed vulture Trigonoceps occipitalis		Sub-Saharan Africa. Extinct populations have occurred in Indonesia.
Torgos Kaup, 1828	Lappet-faced vulture Torgos tracheliotos		Sub-Saharan Africa, the Sinai and Negev deserts and north-west Saudi Arabia
Aegypius Savigny, 1809	Cinereous vulture Aegypius monachus		Southwestern and central Europe, Turkey, the central Middle East, northern India, central and east Asia
Aegypius Savigny, 1809	†Aegypius jinniushanensis		Pleistocene of China
Aegypius Savigny, 1809	†Aegypius prepyrenaicus		Pleistocene of Spain

=== Fossil genera ===
Subfamily	Genus	Common and binomial names	Image	Range
Aegypiinae	†Cryptogyps	†Cryptogyps lacertosus		Pleistocene of Australia
Aegypiinae	†Gansugyps	†Gansugyps linxiaensis		Miocene of China

† = extinct
