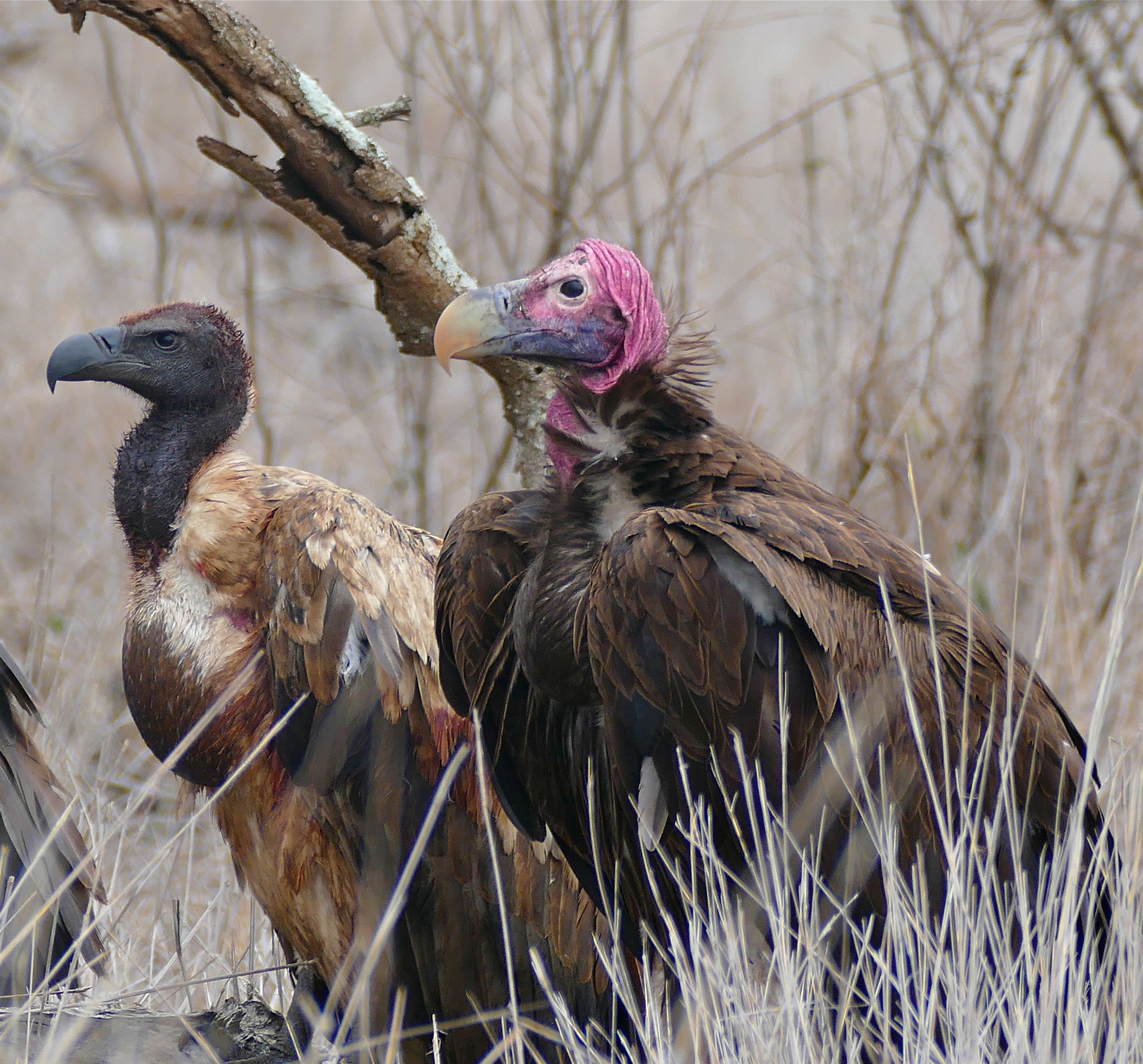
- White-backed vulture (left) and lappet-faced vulture (right)

Scientific classification
- Kingdom: Animalia
- Phylum: Chordata
- Class: Aves
- Order: Accipitriformes
- Family: Accipitridae

Groups included
- Gypaetinae; Aegypiinae

= Old World vulture =

Old World vultures Temporal range: Miocene-Holocene 20.4–0 Ma

Informal group of birds

Old World vultures are vultures that are found in the Old World, i.e. the continents of Europe, Asia and Africa, and which belong to the family Accipitridae, which also includes eagles, buzzards, kites, and hawks.

== Taxonomy ==
Old World vultures are not closely related to the superficially similar New World vultures and condors, and do not share that group's good sense of smell. The similarities between the two groups of vultures are due to convergent evolution, rather than a close relationship. They were widespread in both the Old World and North America during the Neogene. Old World vultures are probably a polyphyletic group within Accipitridae, belonging to two separate not closely related groups within the family. Most authorities refer to two major clades: Gypaetinae (Gypaetus, Gypohierax and Neophron) and Aegypiinae (Aegypius, Gyps, Sarcogyps, Torgos, Trigonoceps and possibly Necrosyrtes). The former seem to be nested with Perninae hawks, while the latter are closely related and possibly even synonymous with Aquilinae. Within Aegypiinae, Torgos, Aegypius, Sarcogyps and Trigonoceps are particularly closely related and possibly within the same genus.

Despite the name of the group, "Old World" vultures were widespread in North America until relatively recently, until the end of the Late Pleistocene epoch around 11,000 years ago.

== Biology ==
Both Old World and New World vultures are scavenging birds, feeding mostly from carcasses of dead animals. Old World vultures find carcasses exclusively by sight. A particular characteristic of many vultures is a semi-bald head, sometimes without feathers or with just simple down. Historically, it was thought that this was due to feeding habits, as feathers would be glued with decaying flesh and blood. However, more recent studies have shown that it is actually a thermoregulatory adaptation to avoid facial overheating; the presence or absence of complex feathers seems to matter little in feeding habits, as some vultures are quite raptorial.

== Species ==
Subfamily	Genus	Common and binomial names	Image	Range
Gypaetinae	Gypaetus	Bearded vulture (Lammergeier); Gypaetus barbatus		High mountains in southern Europe, the Caucasus, Africa, the Indian subcontinent and Tibet
Gypaetinae	Gypohierax	Palm-nut vulture Gypohierax angolensis		Forests and savannahs across sub-Saharan Africa
Gypaetinae	Neophron	Egyptian vulture Neophron percnopterus		Southwestern Europe and North Africa to India
Gypaetinae	†Neophrontops			Native to North America during the Late Pleistocene
Gypaetinae	†Neogyps			Native to North America during the Late Pleistocene
Aegypiinae	Aegypius	Cinereous vulture Aegypius monachus		Southwestern and central Europe, Turkey, the central Middle East, northern India and central and eastern Asia
Aegypiinae	Aegypius	†Aegypius jinniushanensis		Formerly China
Aegypiinae	Aegypius	†Aegypius prepyrenaicus		Formerly Spain
Aegypiinae	Gyps	Griffon vulture Gyps fulvus		Mountains in southern Europe, North Africa, and Asia
Aegypiinae	Gyps	White-rumped vulture Gyps bengalensis		Northern and central India, Pakistan, Nepal, Bangladesh and Southeast Asia
Aegypiinae	Gyps	Rüppell's vulture Gyps rueppelli		The Sahel region of Central Africa
Aegypiinae	Gyps	Indian vulture Gyps indicus		Central and peninsular India
Aegypiinae	Gyps	Slender-billed vulture Gyps tenuirostris		The Sub-Himalayan regions of India and into Southeast Asia
Aegypiinae	Gyps	Himalayan vulture Gyps himalayensis		The Himalayas and the Tibetan Plateau
Aegypiinae	Gyps	White-backed vulture Gyps africanus		Savannahs of West and East Africa
Aegypiinae	Gyps	Cape vulture Gyps coprotheres		Southern Africa
Aegypiinae	Necrosyrtes	Hooded vulture Necrosyrtes monachus		Sub-Saharan Africa
Aegypiinae	Sarcogyps	Red-headed vulture Sarcogyps calvus		The Indian subcontinent, with small disjunct populations in Southeast Asia
Aegypiinae	Torgos	Lappet-faced vulture Torgos tracheliotos		Sub-Saharan Africa, the Sinai and Negev deserts and northwestern Saudi Arabia
Aegypiinae	Trigonoceps	White-headed vulture Trigonoceps occipitalis		Sub-Saharan Africa, formerly native to Indonesia during the Late Pleistocene
Aegypiinae	†Cryptogyps			Native to Australia during the Middle or Late Pleistocene

† = extinct

== Population declines, threats, and implications ==
=== Population declines ===
More than half of the Old World vulture species are listed as vulnerable, endangered, or critically endangered by the IUCN Red List. Population declines are caused by a variety of threats that vary by species and region, with most notable declines in Asia due to diclofenac use. Within Africa, a combination of poisonings and vulture trade (including use as bushmeat and traditional medicine) account for roughly 90% of the population declines. And because vultures are scavengers, their population decline can have cultural, public health, and economic implications for communities and be even more problematic than the decline of other endangered species. Vulture populations are particularly vulnerable because they typically feed in large groups and easily fall victim to mass poisoning events.

=== Threats ===
==== Diclofenac ====
Diclofenac poisoning has caused the vulture population in India and Pakistan to decline by up to 99%, and two or three species of vulture in South Asia are nearing extinction. This has been caused by the practice of medicating working farm animals with diclofenac, which is a non-steroidal anti-inflammatory drug (NSAID) with anti-inflammatory and pain-killing actions. Diclofenac administration keeps animals that are ill or in pain working on the land for longer, but, if the ill animals die, their carcasses contain diclofenac. Farmers leave the dead animals out in the open, relying on vultures to tidy up. Diclofenac present in carcass flesh is eaten by vultures, which are sensitive to diclofenac, and they suffer kidney failure, visceral gout, and death as a result of diclofenac poisoning. The drug is poisonous enough that only a small amount of animal carcases need to contain it to have detrimental effects on vulture populations.

Meloxicam (another NSAID) has been found to be harmless to vultures and should prove an acceptable alternative to diclofenac. Bans on diclofenac in veterinary practices have been implemented in Pakistan and Nepal and selling or using the drug in India can result in jail time. But while the Government of India banned diclofenac, over a year later, in 2007, it continued to be sold and remains a problem in other parts of the world.

==== Poached carcass poisonings ====
Poisoning accounts for a majority of vulture deaths in Africa. Ivory poachers poison carcasses with the intent of killing vultures, since vultures circling over a carcass alert authorities to a kill. An increase in demand for ivory has both increased the rate of elephant poachings as well as increased the rate at which vultures are killed off by consuming the poisoned elephant remains. In Kruger National Park, white-backed vultures will be eradicated in the next 60 years if poisoned carcasses are not detected and neutralized. Eliminating carcass poisoning is challenging because it is far easier to carry out than to regulate. Park officials often lack the training to identify toxic chemicals before it is too late and calling on average community members to turn in perpetrators reports is challenging if financial incentives to do so are insufficient.

==== Agricultural poisonings ====
Vultures are also unintentionally poisoned when they consume carcasses of predators that have been poisoned by livestock farmers. For those who rely on livestock to make a living, illegal pesticides are often used on fruits, meats, or even the water in a wateringhole in order to eliminate large predators that threaten their livestock. Agricultural poisoning is relatively easy as it does not require specific skills and the poison is cheap with a long shelf life.

==== Traditional medicine/belief and use ====
Vultures in Africa are killed for use in traditional medicine as part of the African vulture trade. Vultures can be targeted for the industry directly or collected from other poisoning events, but close to 30% of vulture deaths recorded in Africa can be tied back to belief-based use. In South Africa, vulture consumption events have been estimated to occur 59,000 times a year. Vulture heads are believed to provide clairvoyance or good luck like winning the lottery. Healers believe the length of the medical effect of a vulture depends on size and species. Some healers have been recorded using Cape vulture individuals for 6 years each in the belief that they are particularly long-lasting as a species, lessening their ecological impact. Others use 1-2 individuals a year, an unsustainable rate given the estimated number of healers.

===== Muthi =====
In Southern Africa, traditional medicine is called Muthi. For some healers it is believed to cure illnesses, while others believe it cures curses. Vulture muthi involves separate body parts being dried, burned, or ground up. The results may be consumed by mixing with food, drinking, snorting, or applying to cuts. Some healers look for signs of poisoning when purchasing vultures, but others are unaware of how to do this and are at risk of poisoning their clients.

==== Bushmeat consumption ====
Another part of the African vulture trade is use for bushmeat consumption.

==== Electrical infrastructure ====
Collisions with electrical infrastructure account for roughly 9% of vulture deaths in Africa. Some organizations in South Africa are working with power companies to mitigate this threat.

=== Implications ===
As vultures play an important role in ecosystems, their population decline can have cultural, public health, and economic implications for communities.

The decline in vultures has led to hygiene problems in India as carcasses of dead animals now tend to rot, or be eaten by rats or feral dogs, rather than be consumed by vultures. Rabies among these other scavengers is a major health threat. India has one of the world's highest incidences of rabies.

For communities such as the Parsi, who practice sky burials in which human corpses are put on the top of a Tower of Silence, vulture population declines can have serious cultural implications.

== Conservation efforts ==
Conservation efforts would be most effective in large, protected areas because vultures are most populous in those. Small but frequent poisoning events have a more detrimental effect on vulture populations than larger, infrequent events because population recovery is more successful when there is a longer time between poisonings. To increase populations, vultures can be reintroduced to poison-free protected areas near other groups of vultures to keep the populations high. This will make it easier for vultures to maintain some individuals after a poisoning event. A project named "Vulture Restaurant" is underway in Nepal in an effort to conserve the dwindling number of vultures. The "restaurant" is an open grassy area where naturally dying, sick, and old cows are fed to the vultures.

Organizations across Africa are working to reduce threats to vulture species with efforts to change and create policies to protect species both at the national and international scale. Proposed strategies to reduce poisoning events include mobile phone numbers to report offenders, campaigns to educate about poisoning risks to humans, and improving response speed to poisoning events. Poison response training would be an important implementation in conservation efforts because this is one of the most prevalent threats to vulture populations.
