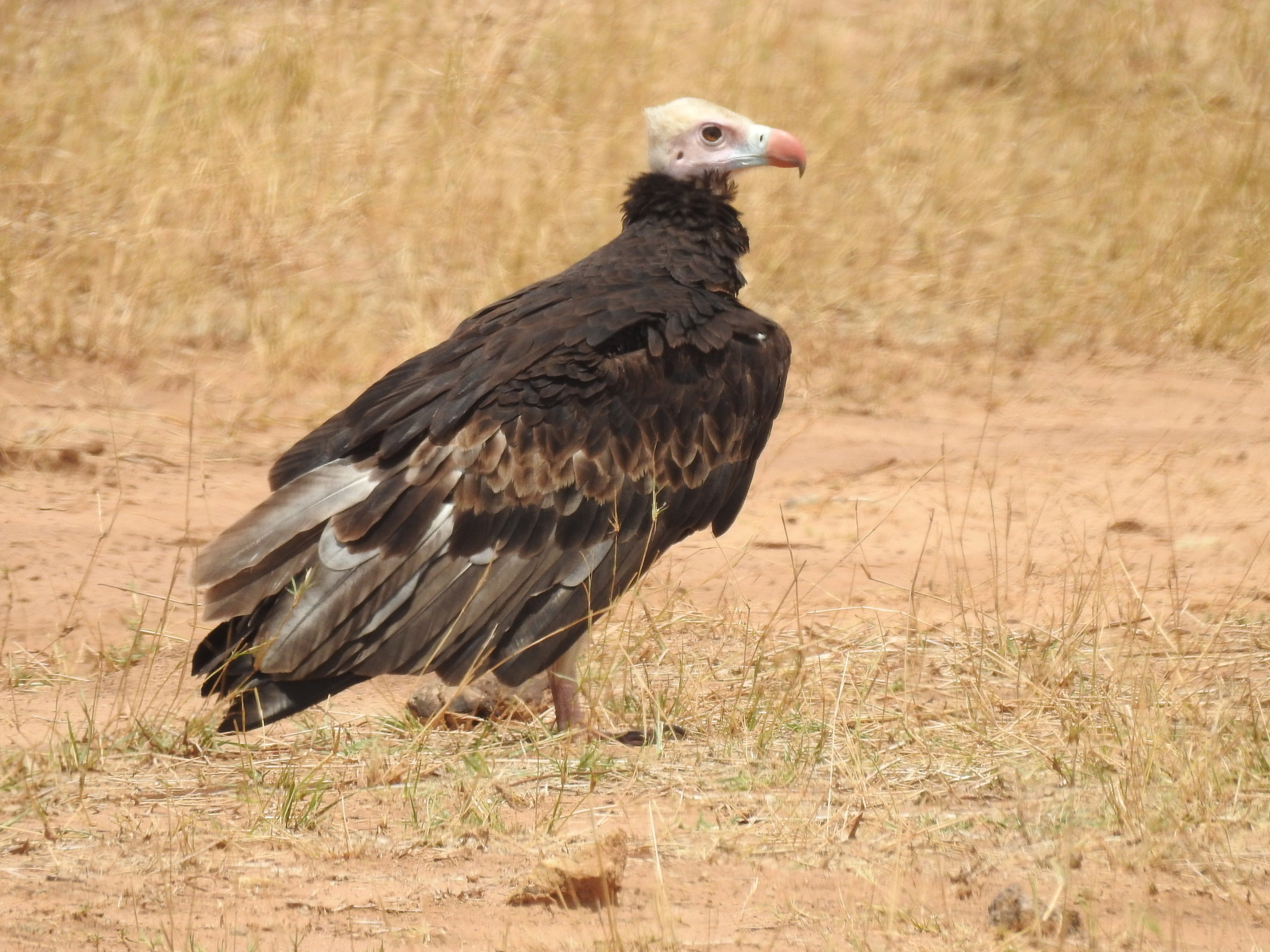
- In Zimbabwe

Conservation status
- Critically Endangered (IUCN 3.1)

Scientific classification
- Kingdom: Animalia
- Phylum: Chordata
- Class: Aves
- Order: Accipitriformes
- Family: Accipitridae
- Genus: Trigonoceps; Lesson, 1842
- Species: T. occipitalis

Binomial name
- Trigonoceps occipitalis (Burchell, 1824)
- Range of T. occipitalis Resident Possibly Extant (resident) Non-breeding Probably extinct Extinct

= White-headed vulture =

Species of bird

The white-headed vulture (Trigonoceps occipitalis) is an Old World vulture endemic to Africa. Populations have been declining steeply in recent years due to habitat degradation and poisoning of vultures at carcasses. An extinct relative was also present in the Indonesian island of Flores during the Late Pleistocene, indicating that the genus was more widespread in the past.

== Distribution and habitat ==
The white-headed vulture is widely spread throughout sub-Saharan Africa, occurring from Senegal and Gambia east to Somalia and south to South Africa and Eswatini. It is locally uncommon to common. A total population of 10,500–18,750 individuals has been estimated, but newer estimates following recent declines suggest a population of just 5,500 individuals. It is estimated that 400 protected areas contain 1893 white-headed vulture nests, with 721 nests occurring in East Africa, 548 in Central Africa, 468 in Southern Africa and 156 in West Africa.

The species prefers mixed, dry woodland at low altitudes. It occurs at elevations of up to 4,000 m (13,000 ft) in Ethiopia, perhaps 3,000 m (9,800 ft) in Kenya, and can be found in thorny Acacia-dominated landscape in Botswana. It generally avoids human habitation, and is largely restricted to protected areas. For example, the Kruger National Park and neighbouring conservation areas hold the largest population of the species in South Africa.

== Description ==
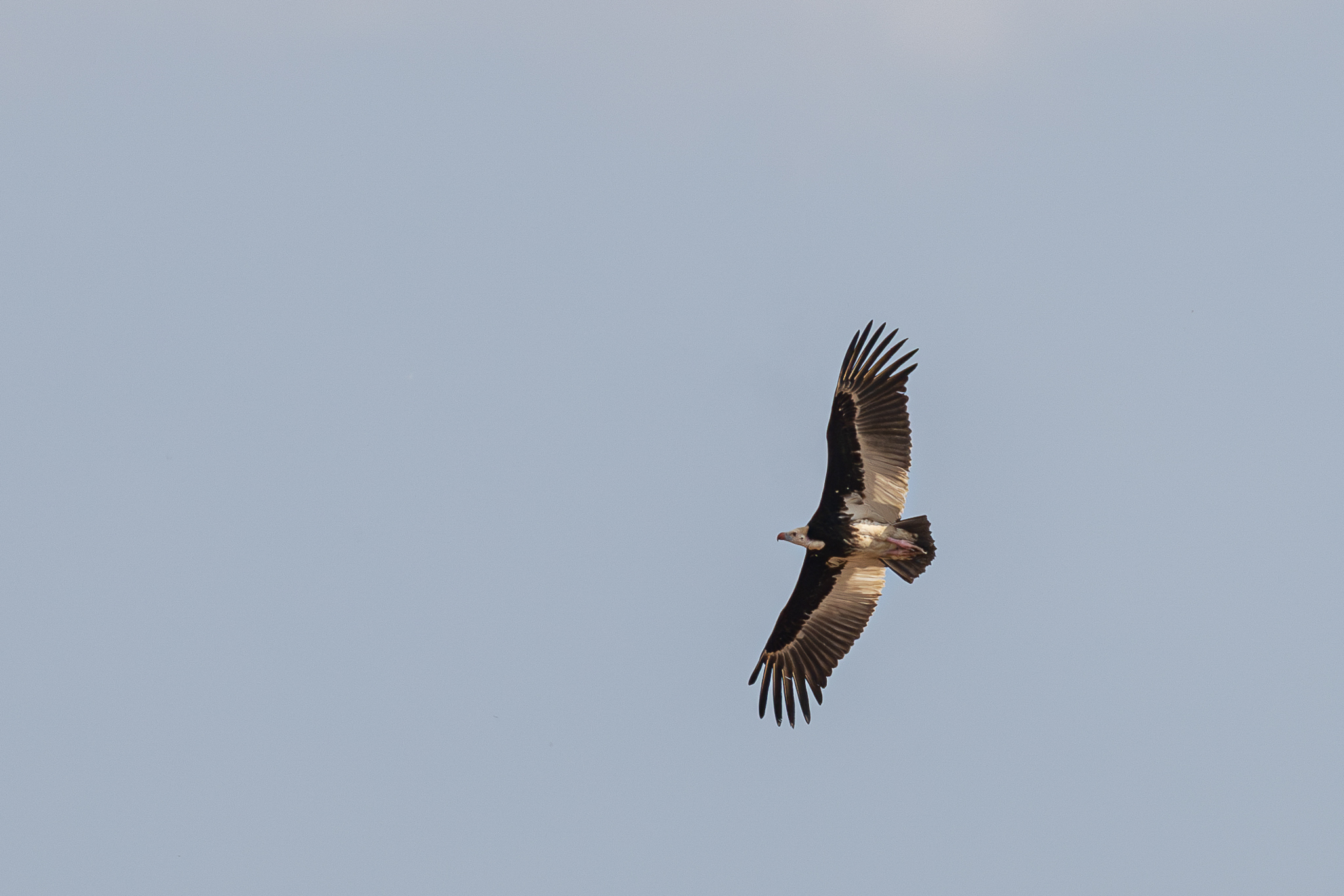
In flight, in Uganda

The white-headed vulture is a medium-sized vulture, 72–85 centimetres (28–33 in) in length and with a wingspan of 207–230 centimetres (81–91 in). Females have an average weight of 4.7 kilograms (10 lb), while males are generally lighter at 4 kilograms (8.8 lb) or less. This species is unique among African vultures as it shows a degree of reversed sexual dimorphism, where females are somewhat larger than males.

It has a pink beak and a white crest, and the featherless areas on its head are pale. It has dark brown upper parts and black tail feathers. The feathers on its lower parts and legs are white, giving it its diagnostic image from below. These vultures are easily distinguishable from all other vulture species as the plumage exhibits a strong contrast between black and white. Individual white-headed vultures can also be reliably identified based on a unique pattern in their median wing coverts.

The white-headed vulture is the only vulture species with a sexually dimorphic plumage. Males have dark grey secondary feathers, while in females the secondaries are white.

== Ecology ==
=== Reproduction and lifecycle ===
The species is long-lived and appears to be loyal to a territory where it remains resident. It builds nests in trees (mostly acacias or baobabs). Senegalia species are also preferred, with nests occurring on the top of the canopy in low relief, flatter areas. These vultures usually lay a single egg a couple of months after the rainy season has ended and the dry season is underway. It is generally a solitary species and nests in isolated, possibly territorial pairs. From a study across 73 pairs, the average productivity of 55 breeding attempts was 0.69 chicks per pair. White headed vultures are known to exhibit a characteristic breeding behaviour. From a study in the Kruger National Park, copulation only occurred on the nest and is described as a subtle and inconspicuous process that lasts approximately 15 to 20 seconds. Preceding actual copulation the female bird stands perpendicular to and in front of the male. The "head turning" behaviour, typically observed in other aegypiine vultures, was not observed. The sound made by the birds during copulation is unusual and best described as a very deep squeak, but longer than a grunt.

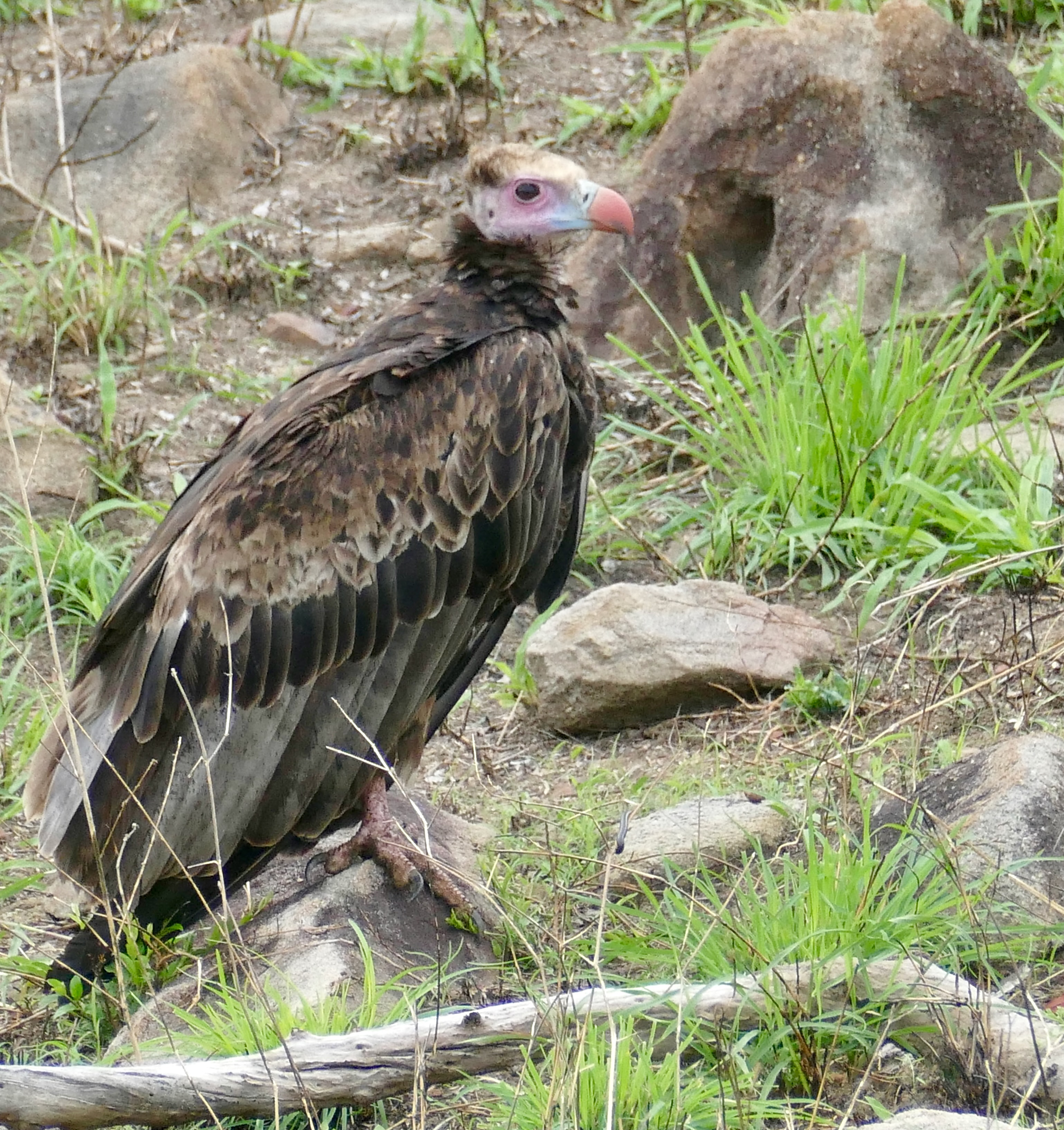
Immature, at Kruger National Park

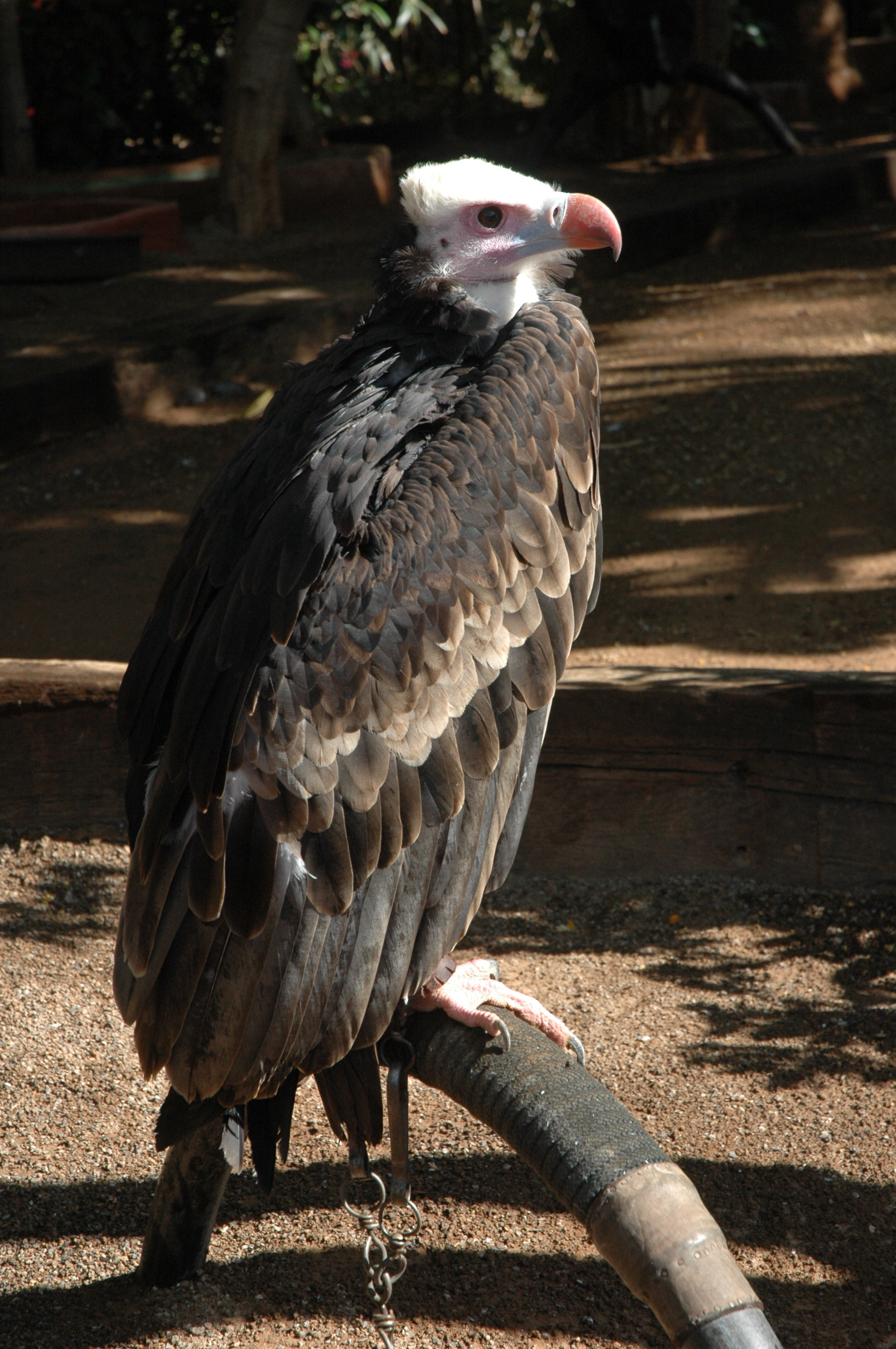
Adult, in captivity

=== Diet and feeding biology ===
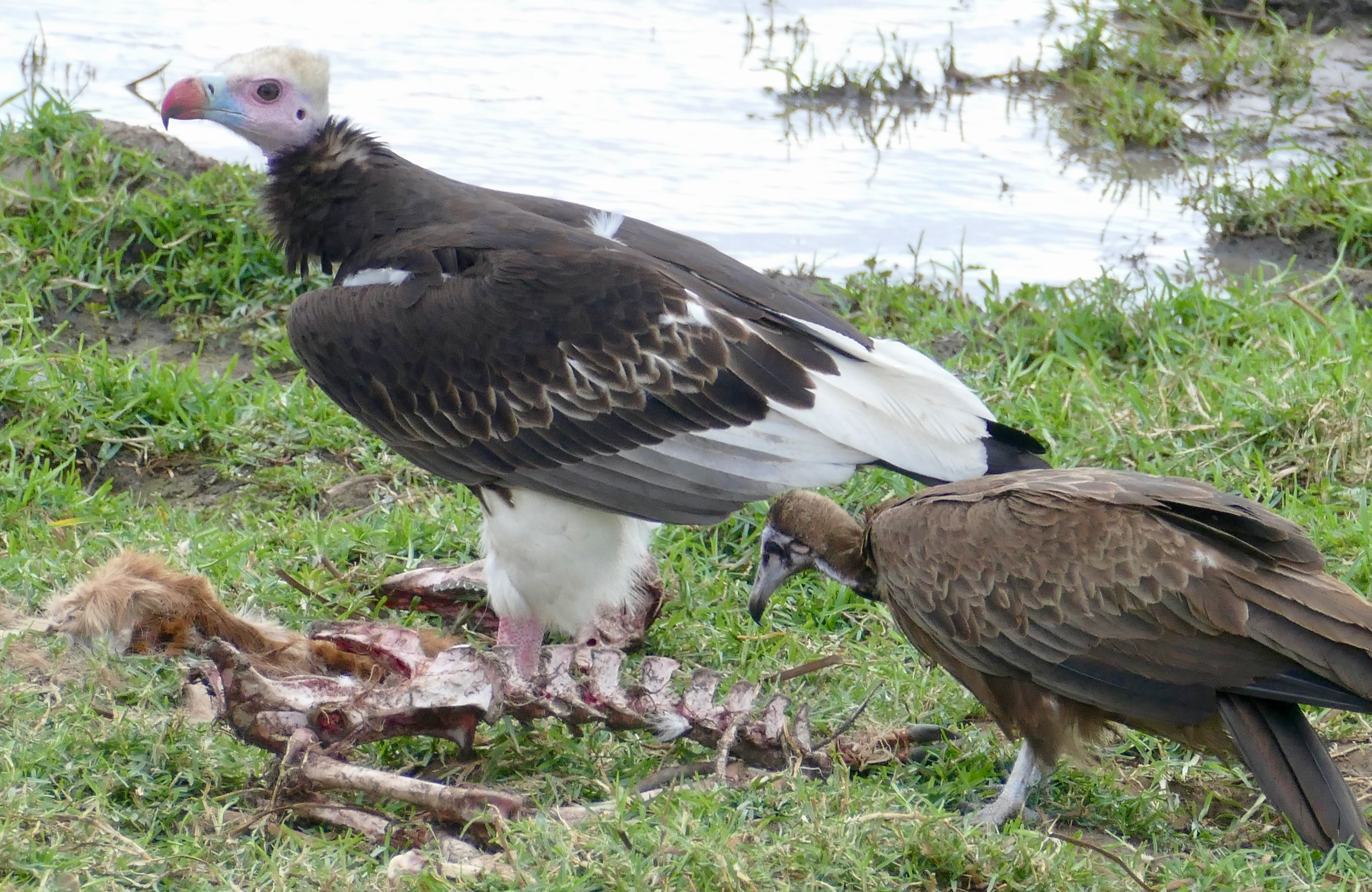
At a carcass with a hooded vulture, at Kruger National Park

The white-headed vulture is predominantly a carrion-eater; frequently flying lower than other vulture species, it is often the first species to turn up at a carcass. However, the species is probably also an active predator if the occasion arises. For example, instances of pairs preying on species such as the slender mongoose (Galarella sanguinea), monitor lizard (Varanus spp), tree squirrel (Paraxerus cepapi) and scrub hare (Lepus saxatilis) have been recorded. In three of these four events, cooperative behaviour between the birds was apparent, thereby suggesting that this behaviour is not uncommon. There was also no observable agonistic behaviour between birds while feeding, and the birds appeared practiced and unaffected by the presence of an observer. These observations suggest that the vulture might be regular facultative predators. However, extensive field reports are lacking therefore further research is warranted.

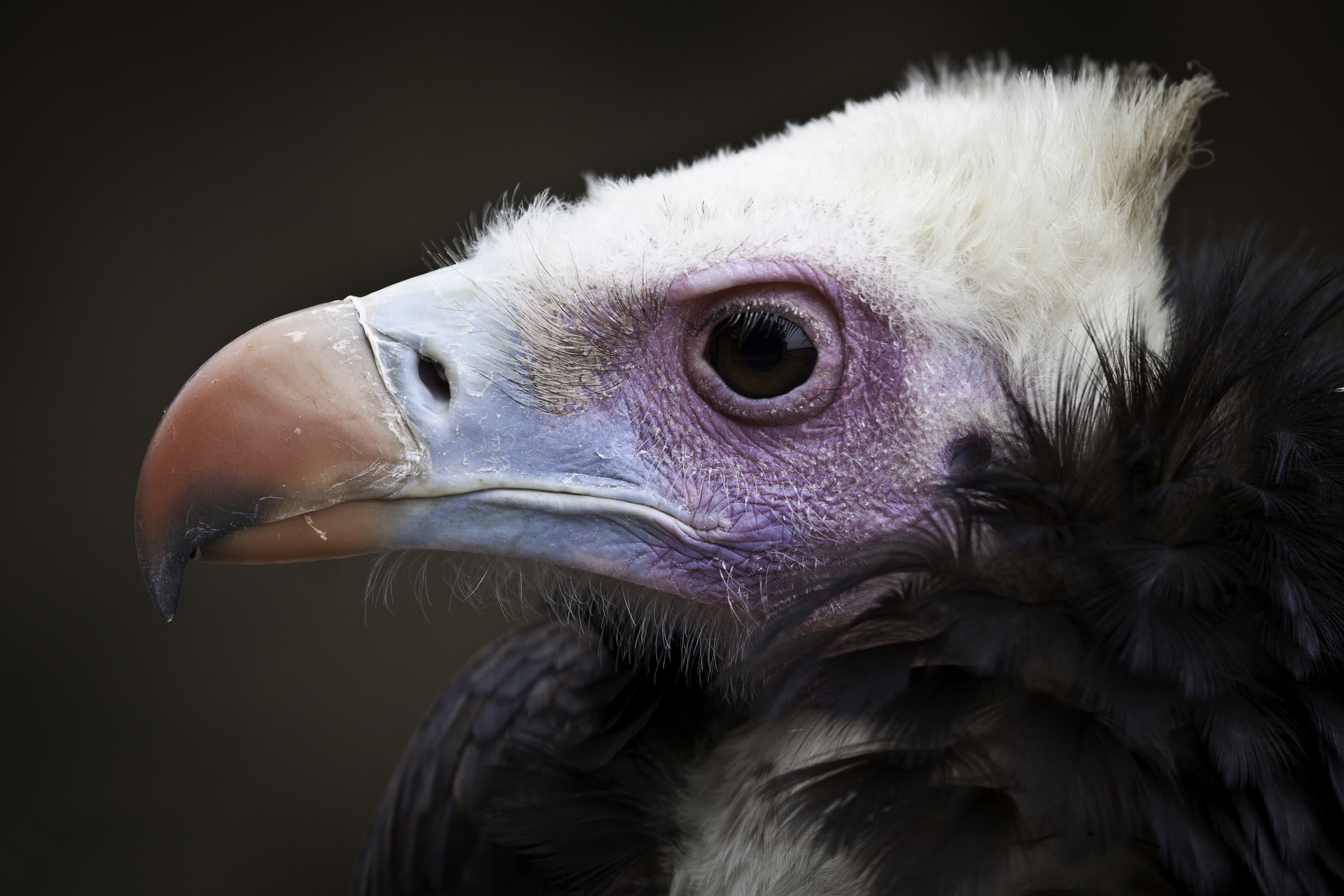
Closeup of the head

Additionally, the visual field of this vulture species is more similar to other predatory species such as the accipitrid hawk than to that of more closely related, carrion feeding Gyps vultures. Specifically, they have a significantly wider binocular field (30°, compared to the 20° of Gyps vultures), which is thought to help with the accurate placement and timing of the talons necessary to capture live prey.

== Conservation and threats ==
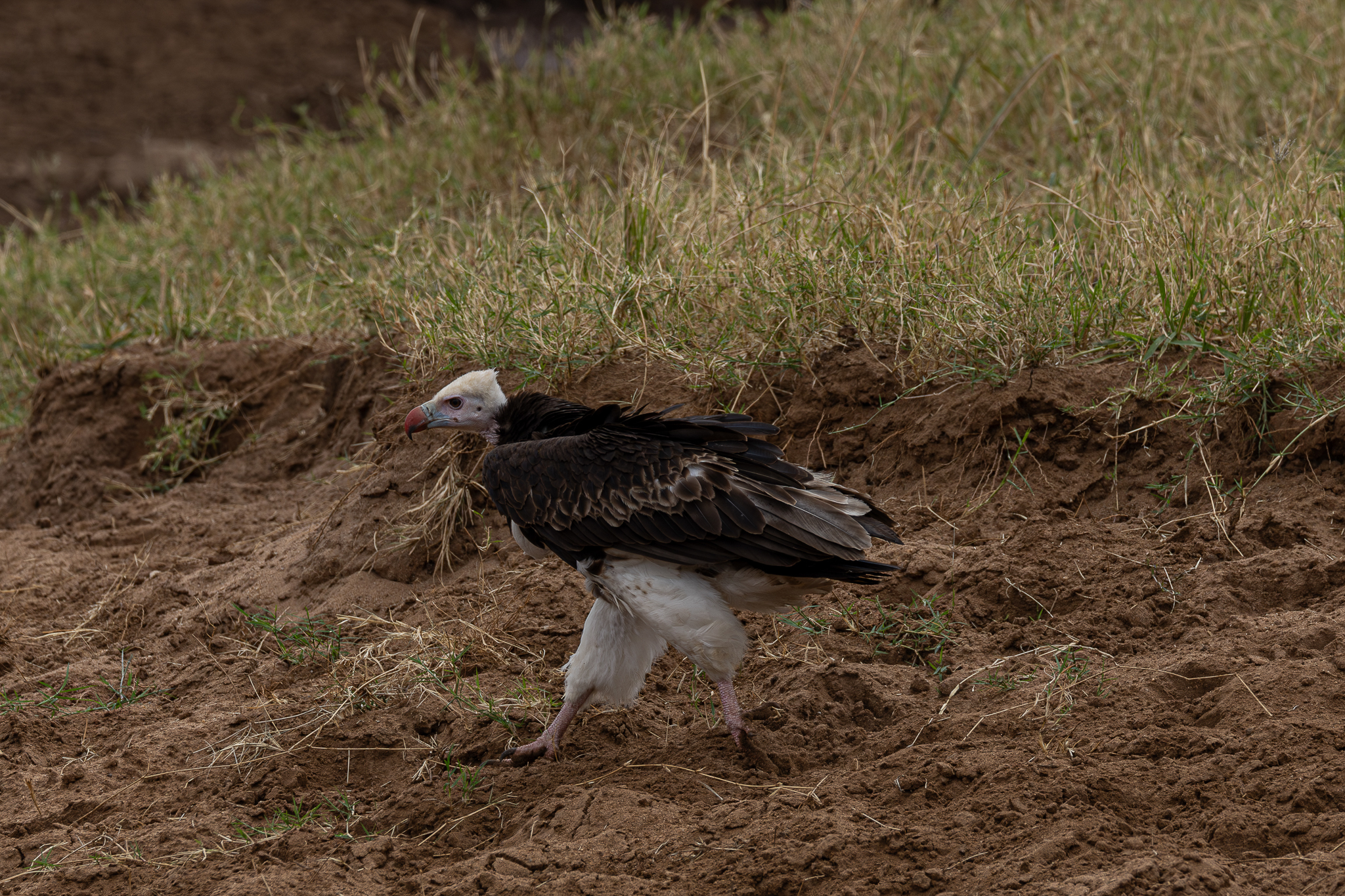
Walking on the ground, in Uganda

White-headed vulture populations have been declining since the early 1940s; it was classified as Vulnerable in the 2007 IUCN Red List. Recent indications that the species is rarer than previously thought have led to a status upgrade to Critically Endangered in 2015.

The main threats to white-headed vulture populations are reductions in the availability of suitable food sources (carcasses of medium-sized mammals and ungulates) and the loss of habitat to the spread of urban and agricultural developments. Poisoning through baits set for other carnivores such as jackals and hyenas, as well as targeted poisoning of vultures (by poachers who seek to prevent vultures from drawing attention to an illegal kill), is also an important factor. Secondary causes of decline is exploitation for the international trade in raptors and use in traditional medicines. The species is highly sensitive to land-use and tends to depart from degraded habitat, leading to high concentrations in protected areas. Potential introduction of the anti-inflammatory drug Diclofenac, which is fatal to all vultures of the closely related genus Gyps when ingested at livestock carcasses, may represent a potential future threat.

On 20 June 2019, the carcasses of 468 white-backed vultures, 17 white-headed vultures, 28 hooded vultures, 14 lappet-faced vultures and 10 cape vultures, altogether 537 vultures, besides 2 tawny eagles, were found in northern Botswana. It is suspected that they died after eating the carcasses of 3 elephants that were poisoned by poachers, possibly to avoid detection by the birds, which help rangers to track poaching activity by circling above where there are dead animals.

== Gallery ==
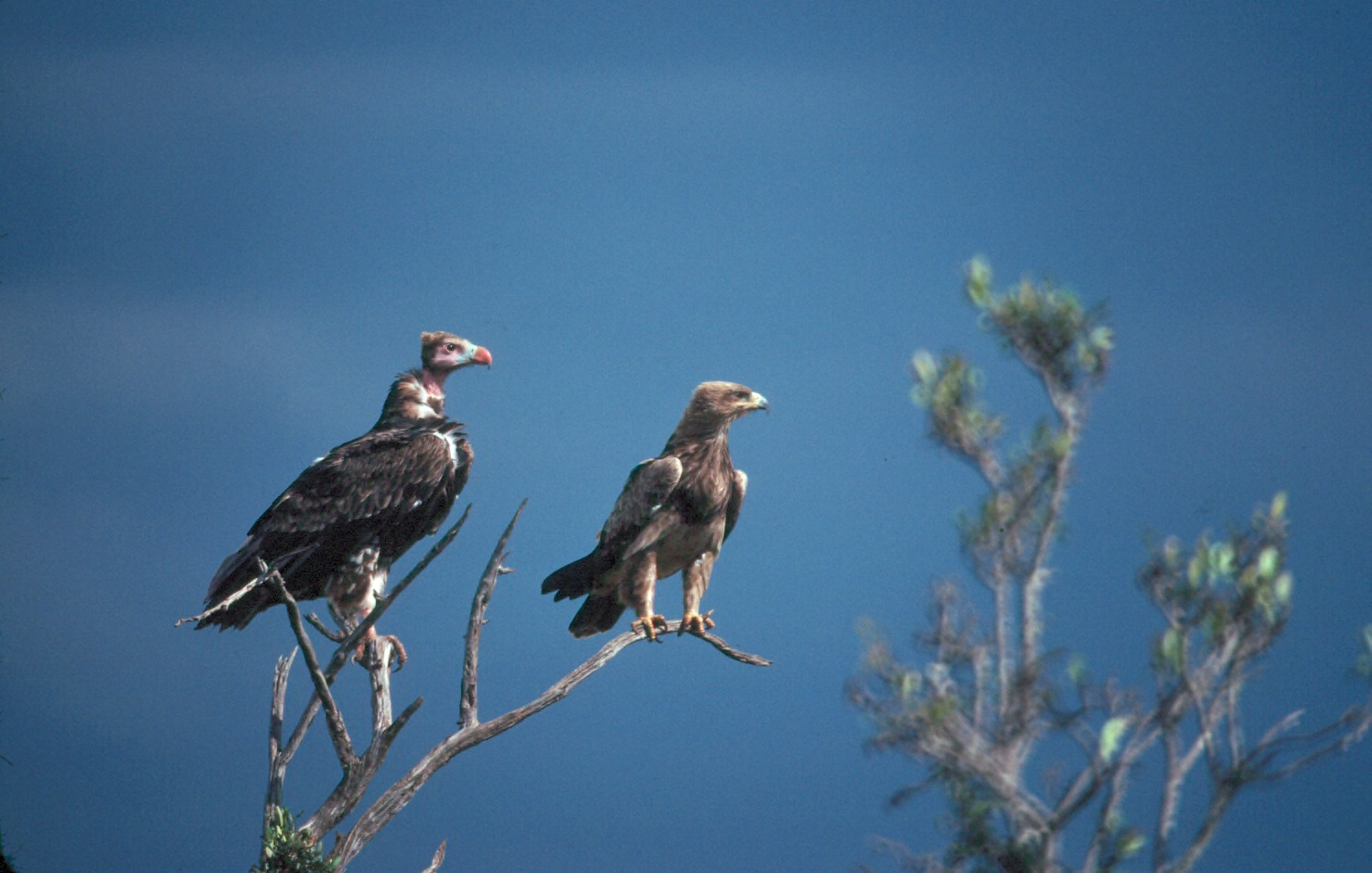

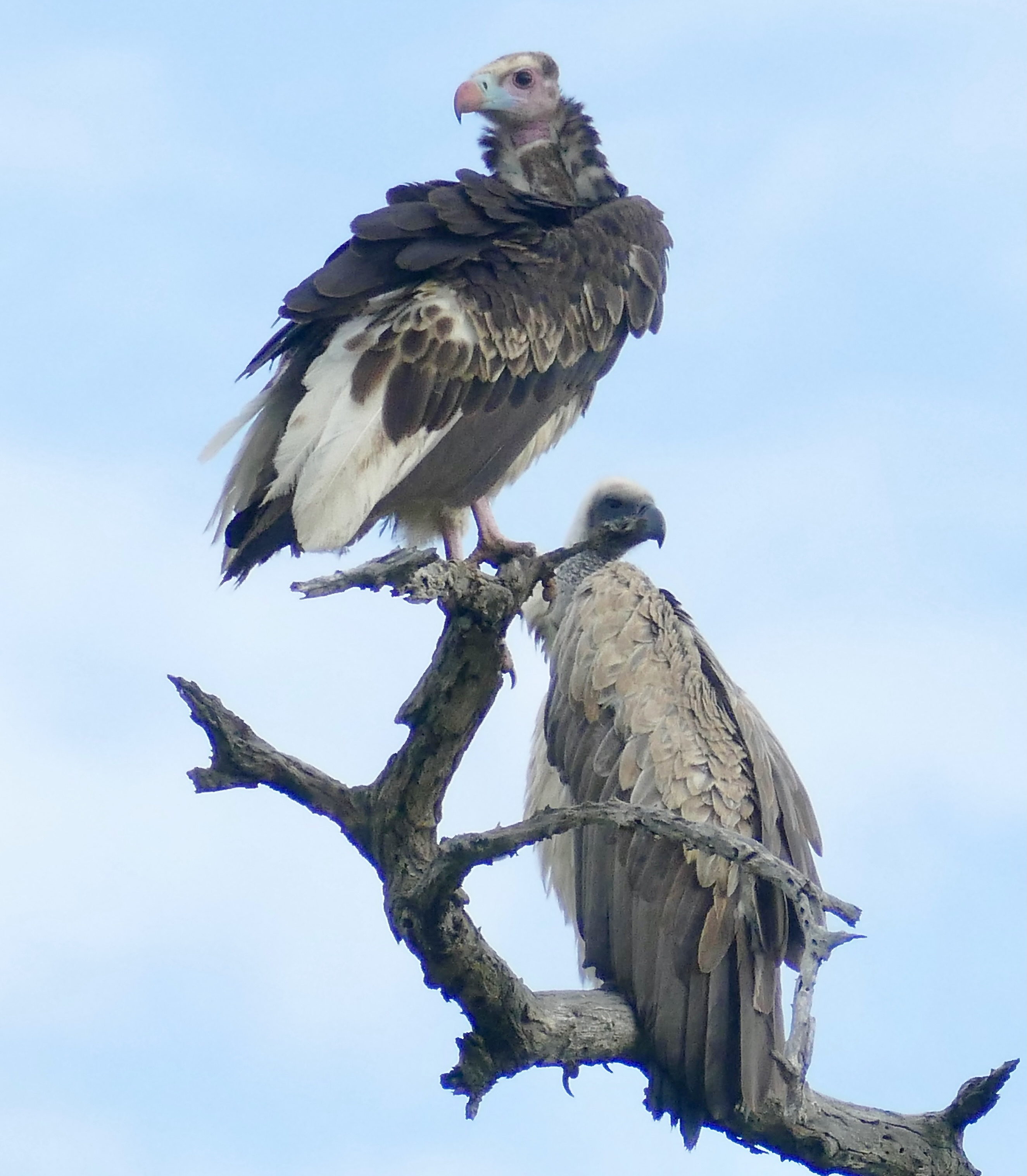

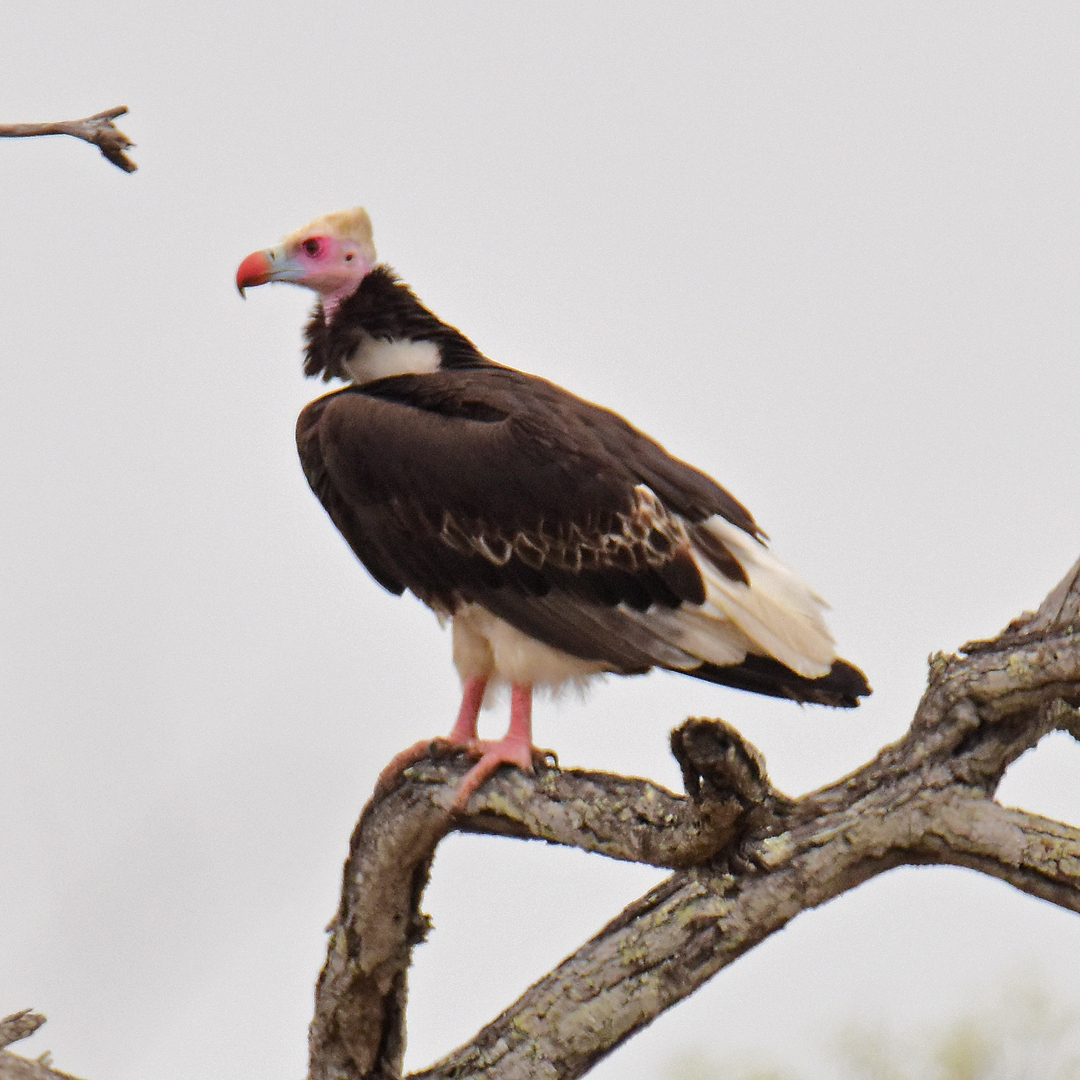

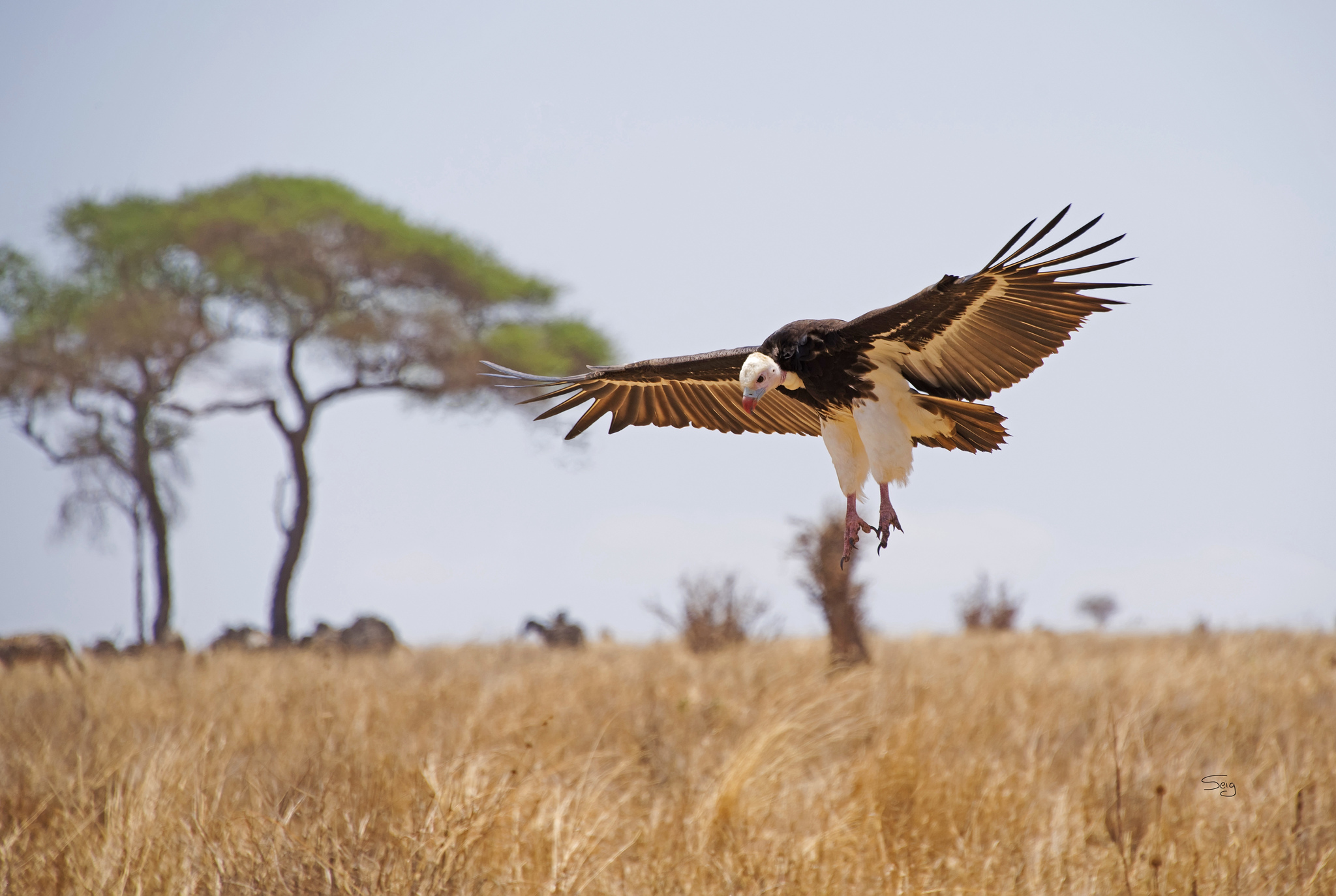

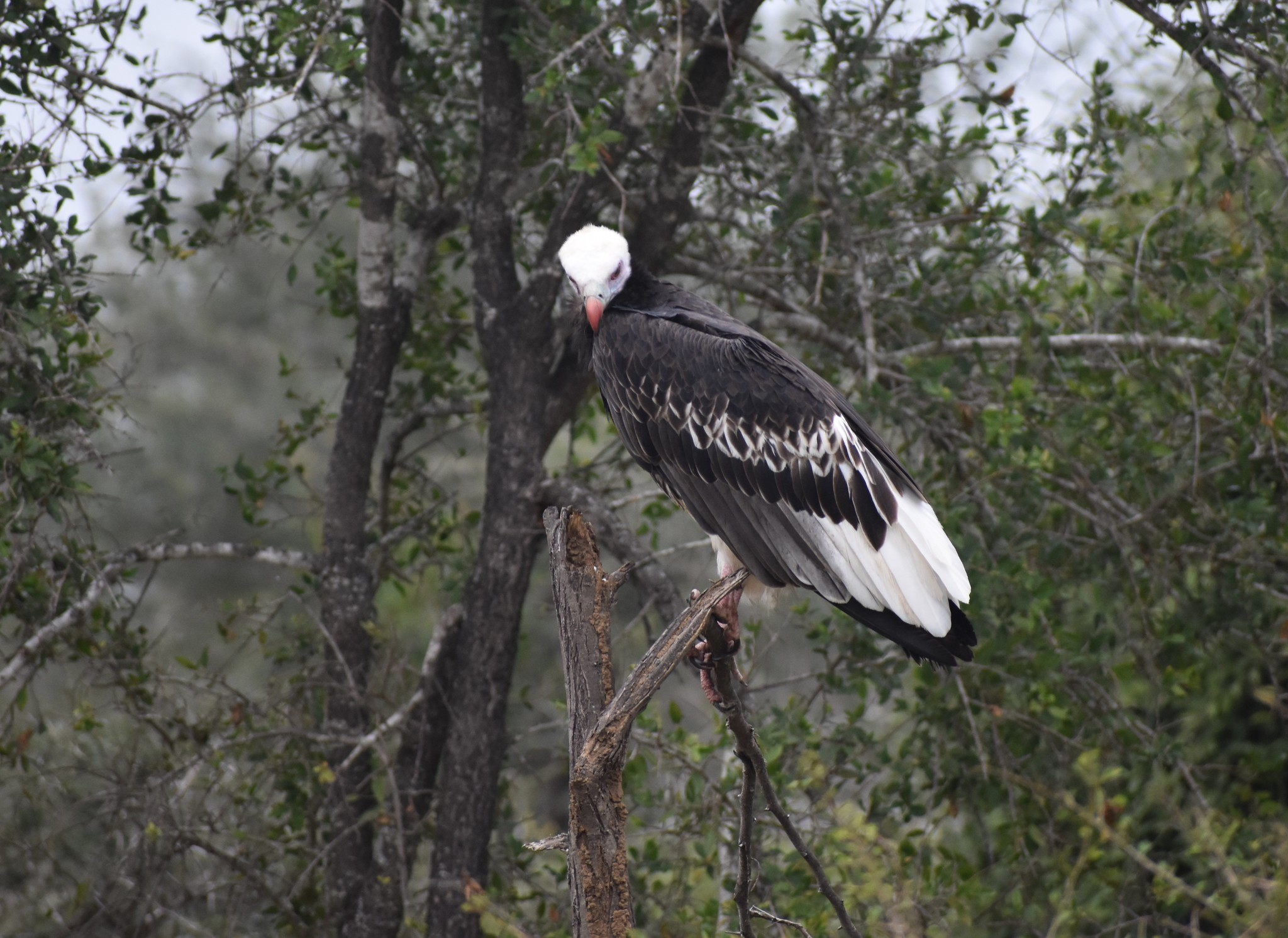

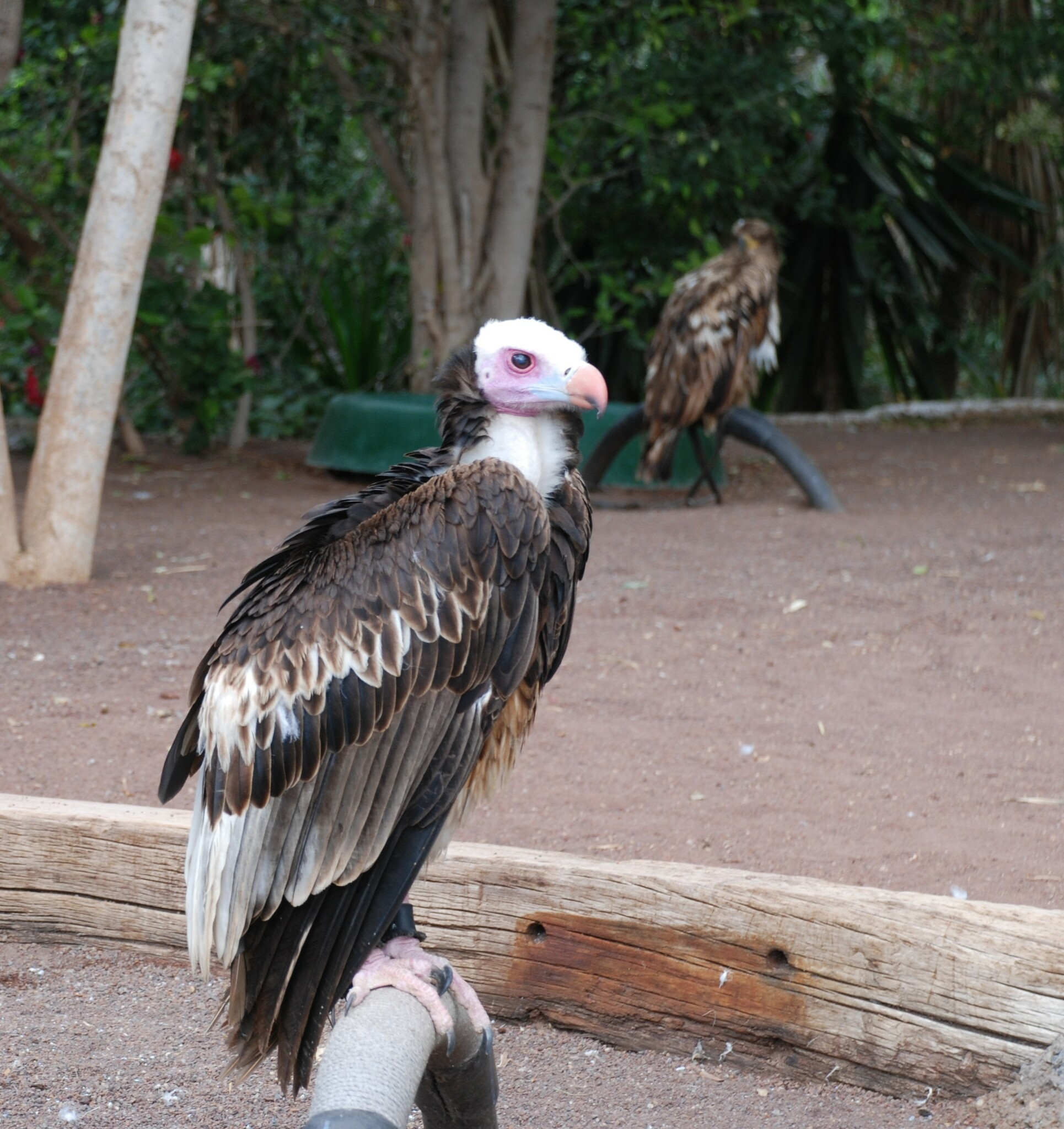
