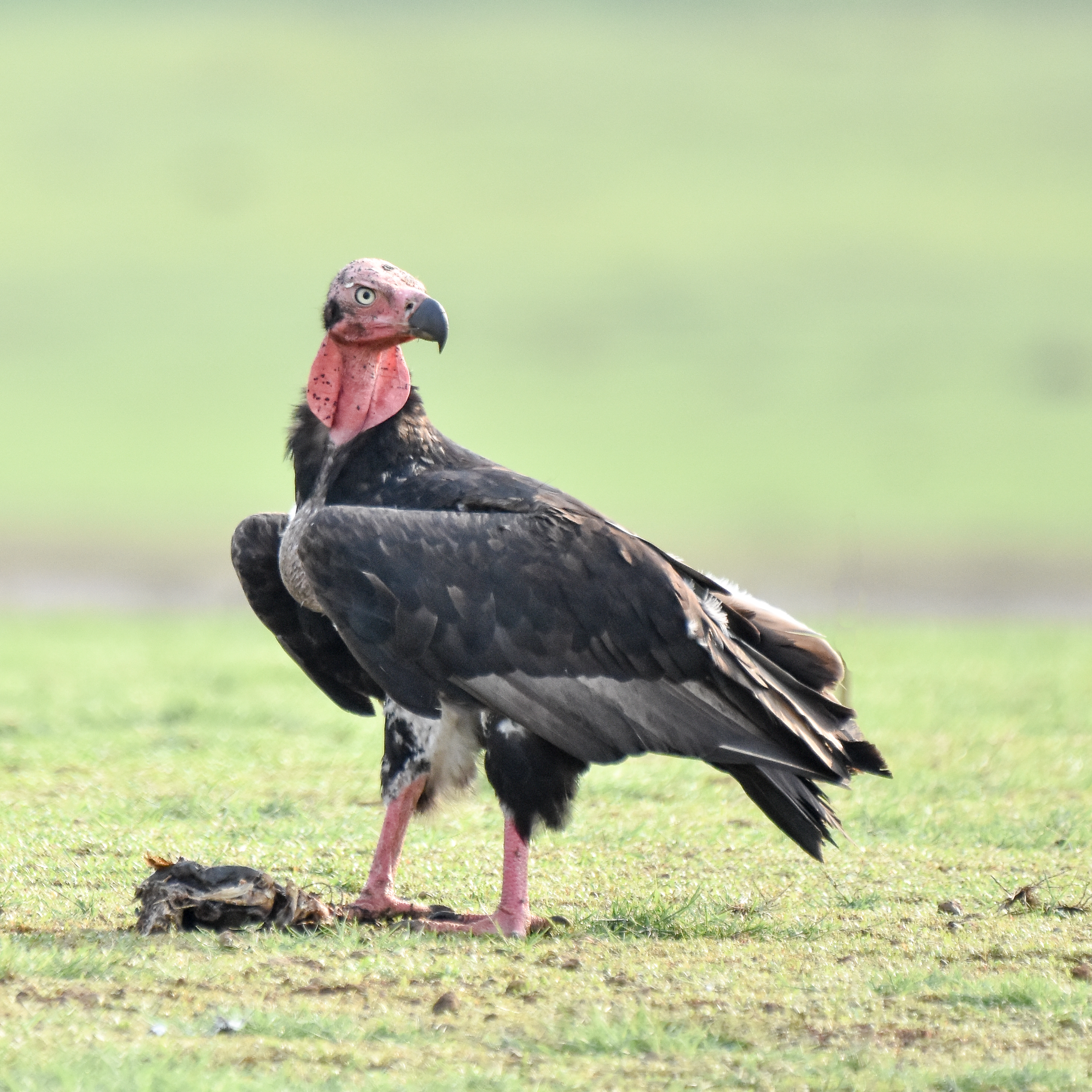
- Male in Karnataka, India

Conservation status
- Critically Endangered (IUCN 3.1)

Scientific classification
- Kingdom: Animalia
- Phylum: Chordata
- Class: Aves
- Order: Accipitriformes
- Family: Accipitridae
- Genus: Sarcogyps; Lesson, 1842
- Species: S. calvus

Binomial name
- Sarcogyps calvus (Scopoli, 1786)
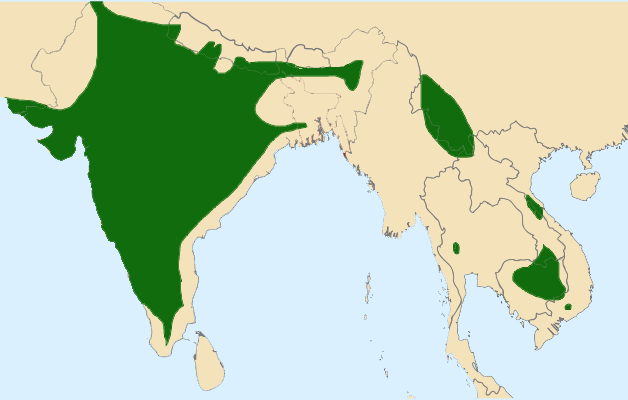
- Current distribution range of red headed vulture

Synonyms
- Aegypius calvus; Torgos calvus

= Red-headed vulture =

Species of bird

The red-headed vulture (Sarcogyps calvus), also known as the Asian king vulture, Indian black vulture or Pondicherry vulture, is an Old World vulture mainly found in the Indian subcontinent, with small disjunct populations in some parts of Southeast Asia.

== Taxonomy and systematics ==
This is a species of Old World vulture, and the only member of the genus Sarcogyps. The generic name Sarcogyps is a combination of the Greek words sarx, meaning "flesh", and gups, meaning "vulture". The specific epithet calvus is Latin for "bald". The red-headed vulture is monotypic; it has no accepted subspecies.

== Distribution and habitat ==
This gaudy-faced vulture was historically abundant, range widely across the Indian subcontinent, and also eastwards to south-central and south-eastern Asia, extending from India to Singapore. Today the range of the red-headed vulture is localized primarily to northern India. It is usually in open country and in cultivated and semi-desert areas. It is also found in deciduous forests and foothills and river valleys. It is usually found up to an altitude of 3000m from sea level.

== Description ==
It is a medium-sized vulture of 76 to 86 cm (30 to 34 in) in length, weighing 3.5–6.3 kg (7.7–13.9 lb) and having a wingspan of about 1.99–2.6 m (6.5–8.5 ft). It has a prominent naked head: deep-red to orange in the adult, paler red in the juvenile. It has a black body with pale grey band at the base of the flight feathers. The sexes differ in colour of the iris: males have a paler, whitish iris, whilst in females it is dark brown.

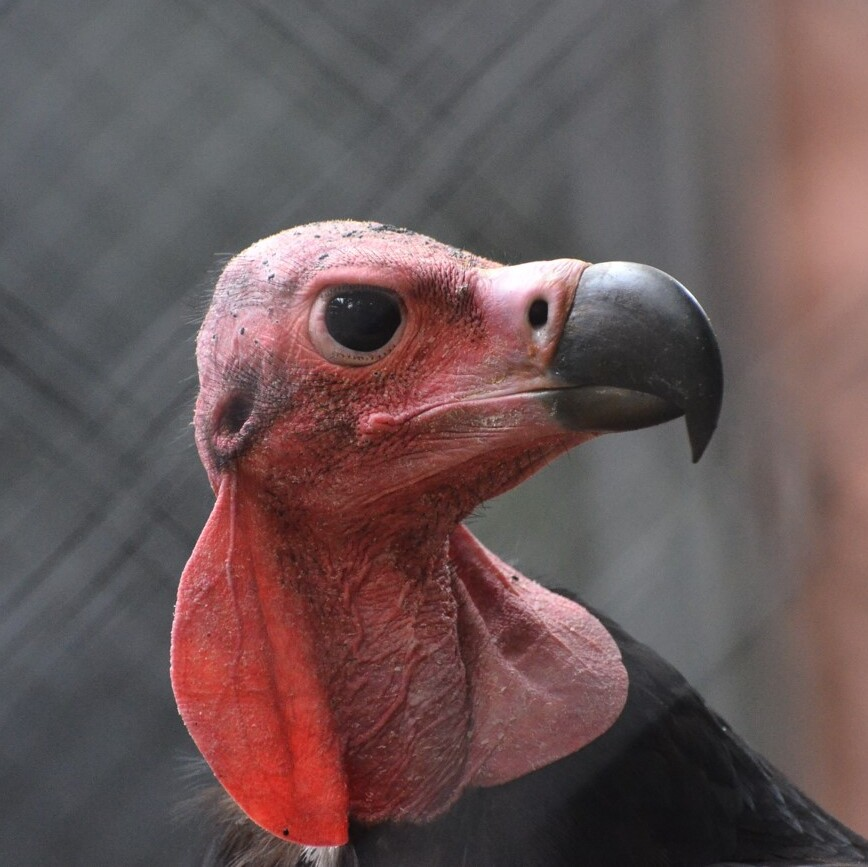
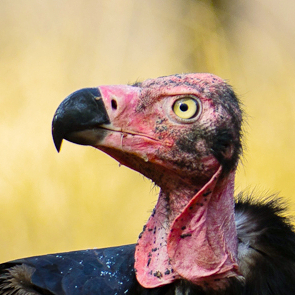
Female (left) and male (right), showing the difference in eye colour

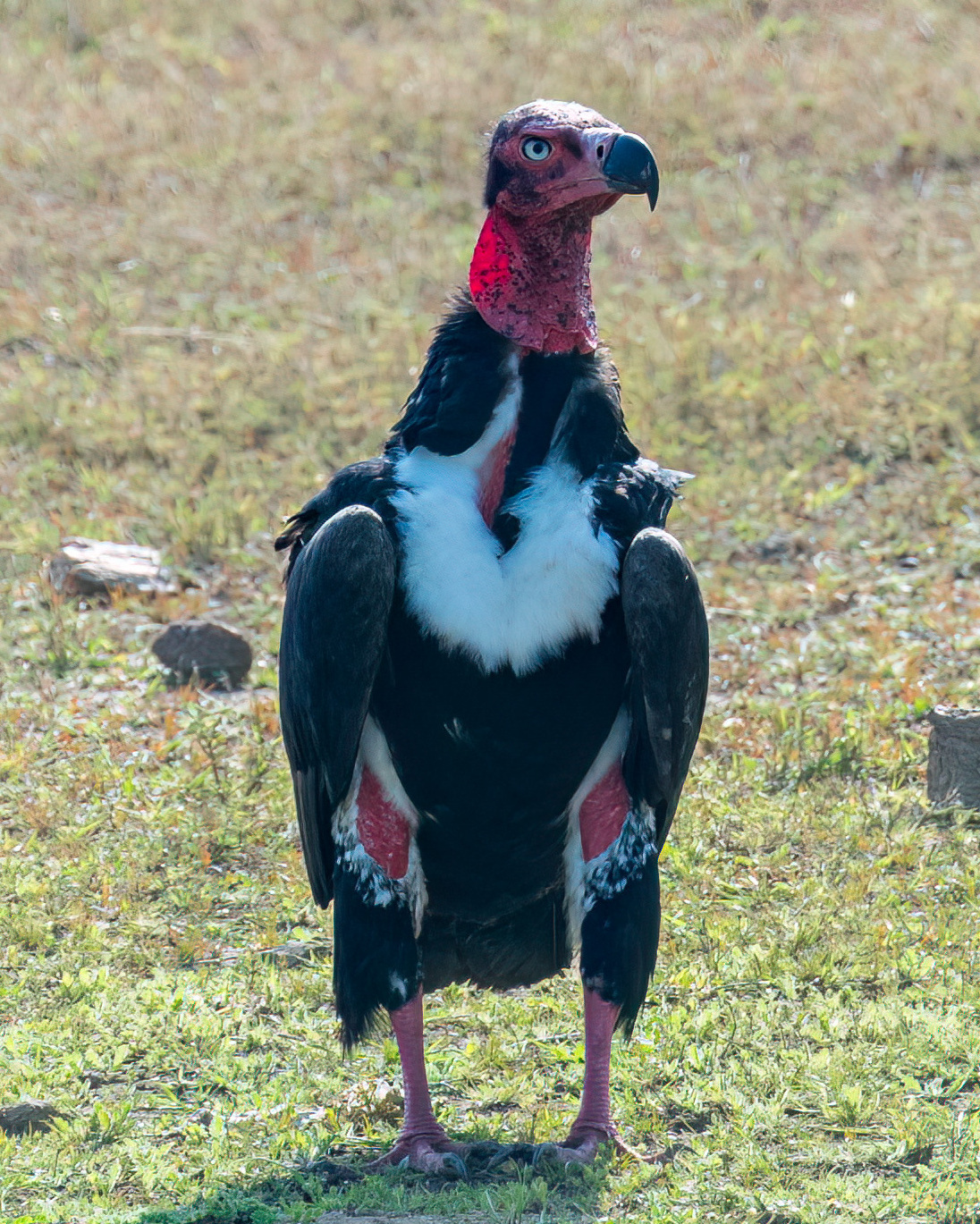
Male front view, in Karnataka, India

The red-headed vulture is very similar in appearance to its larger relative the lappet-faced vulture in Africa and Arabia, even being historically placed in the genus Torgos

== Threats ==
=== Pharmaceutical toxins and diclofenac ===
A significant factor in the rapid decline of red-headed vulture populations since the 21st century is the pharmaceutical NSAID diclofenac, used to treat livestock. This substance has proven highly toxic to vultures, leading to mortality from renal failure and visceral gout. Recent findings indicate that red-headed vulture populations in India have shown signs of recovery following a ban on diclofenac, suggesting the drug's adverse effects on the species.

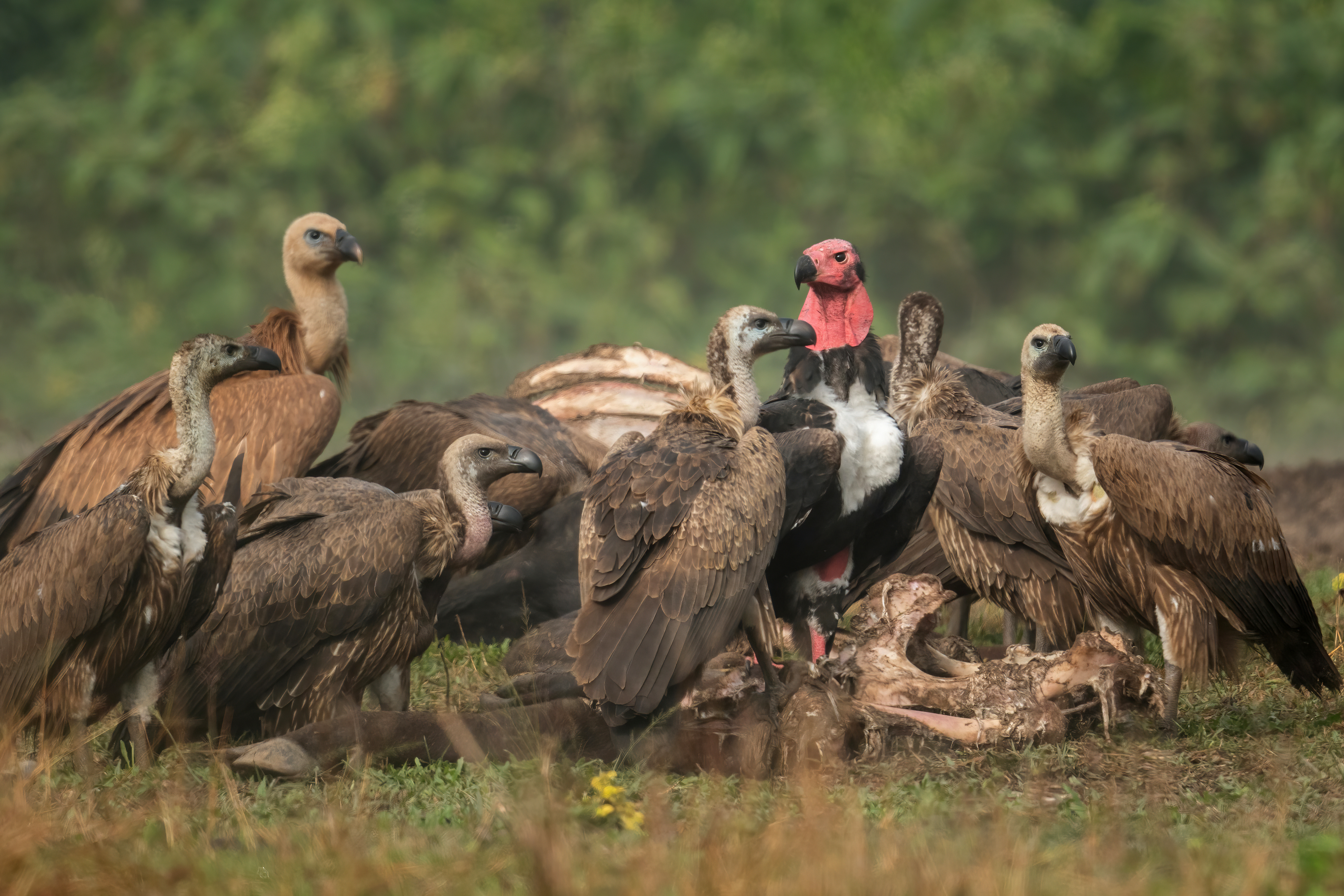
Female with Gyps vultures

=== Human activities ===
Incidental mortality occurs in Cambodia due to the widespread use of poisons for catching fish or waterbirds at trapeangs (waterholes). Intentional poisoning for belief-based use has also been reported in Cambodia. Additionally, the logging of nesting trees, electrocution, and collisions with powerlines are potential threats to the species.

=== Competition among vulture species ===
In the shared ecosystem, dominant vulture species like Gyps vultures have a competitive advantage in scavenging on carcasses. They typically outcompete the red-headed vulture for access to food resources, which can lead to food scarcity for the species. As a result, the red-headed vulture may have limited access to suitable feeding opportunities, potentially affecting its survival and contributing to its population decline.

== Conservation status ==
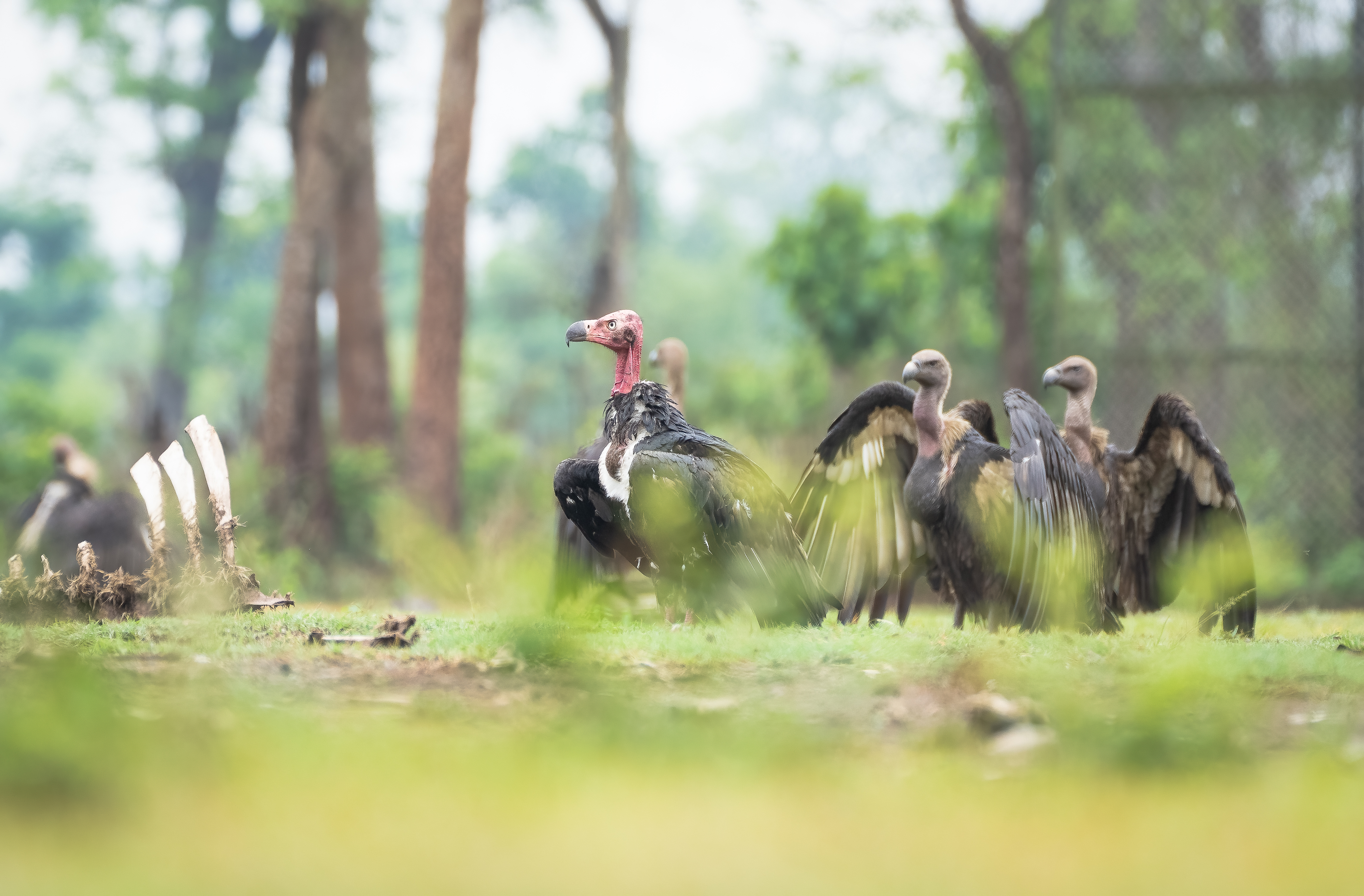
Male with white-rumped vultures

The red-headed vulture's populations used to be only slowly declining; in 2004 the species was uplisted to near threatened from least concern by the IUCN. In recent years however, the widespread use of the NSAID diclofenac in veterinary medicine in India has caused its population to collapse. Diclofenac is a compound now known to be extremely poisonous to vultures. The red-headed vulture population has essentially halved every other year since the late 1990s, and what once was a plentiful species numbering in the hundreds of thousands has come dangerously close to extinction in less than two decades. Consequently, it was uplisted to critically endangered in the 2007 IUCN Red List.

Several NSAIDs have been found to be harmful to scavenging birds. Diclofenac, carprofen, flunixin, ibuprofen and phenylbutazone were associated with mortality. Meloxicam has thus far been found to be "Vulture-Safe" and its use in veterinary treatment of livestock is being encouraged.

The red-headed vulture has become increasingly difficult to find due to hunting. In places like Cambodia, special programs have been implemented to support critically endangered vulture species. Evidence has shown that hunters have started using poisons in their hunting practices. Population analysis indicates that since 2010, populations of the white-rumped vulture (Gyps bengalensis) and red-headed vulture (Sarcogyps calvus) have declined, while the slender-billed vulture (Gyps tenuirostris) may have also begun to decline since 2013.

In an assessment made in 2021 assessed there are 2500-9999 mature individuals in the wild.

== Gallery ==
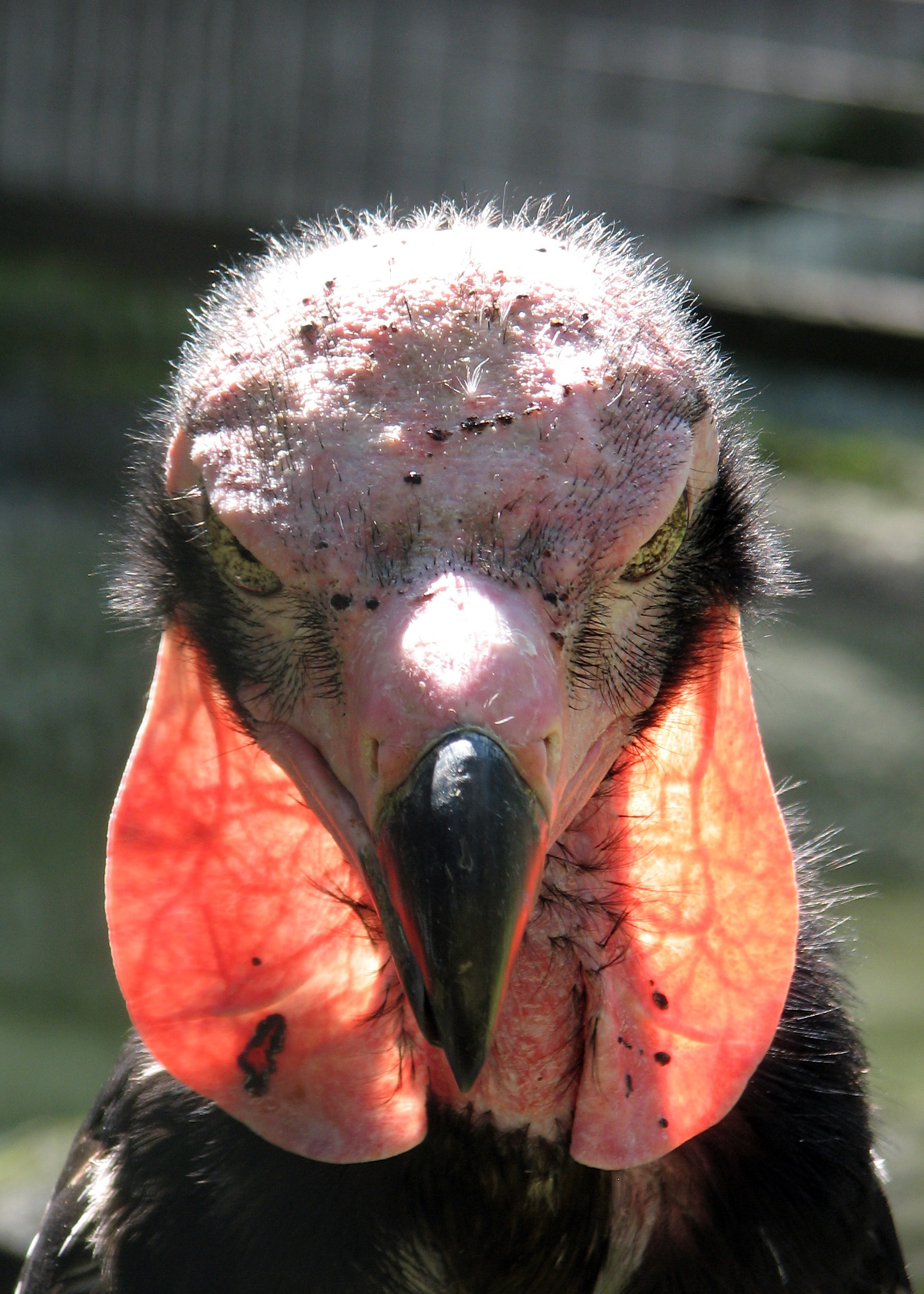
Male showing the lappets with the sun shining through them

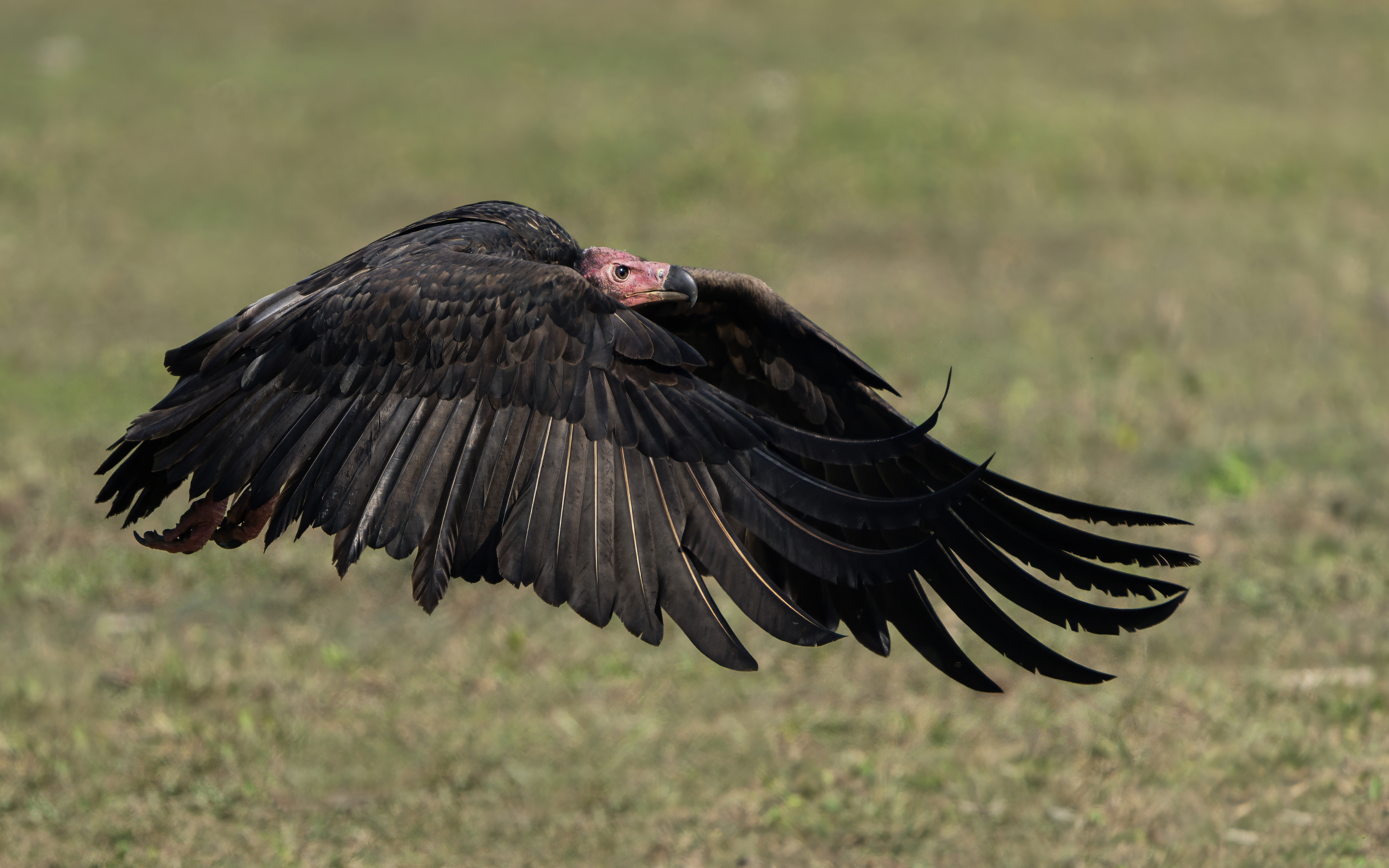
Female in flight

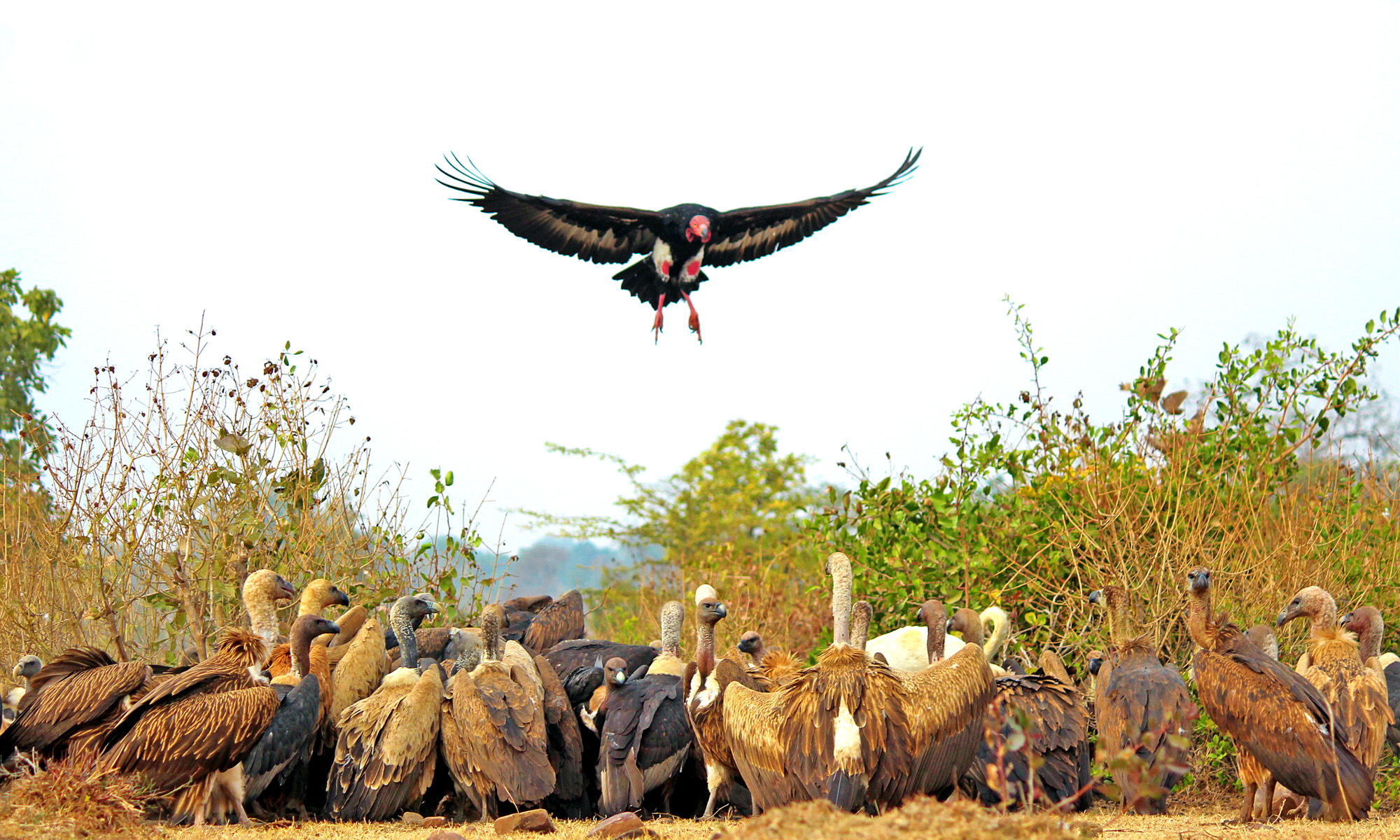
Flying above several species of Gyps vultures

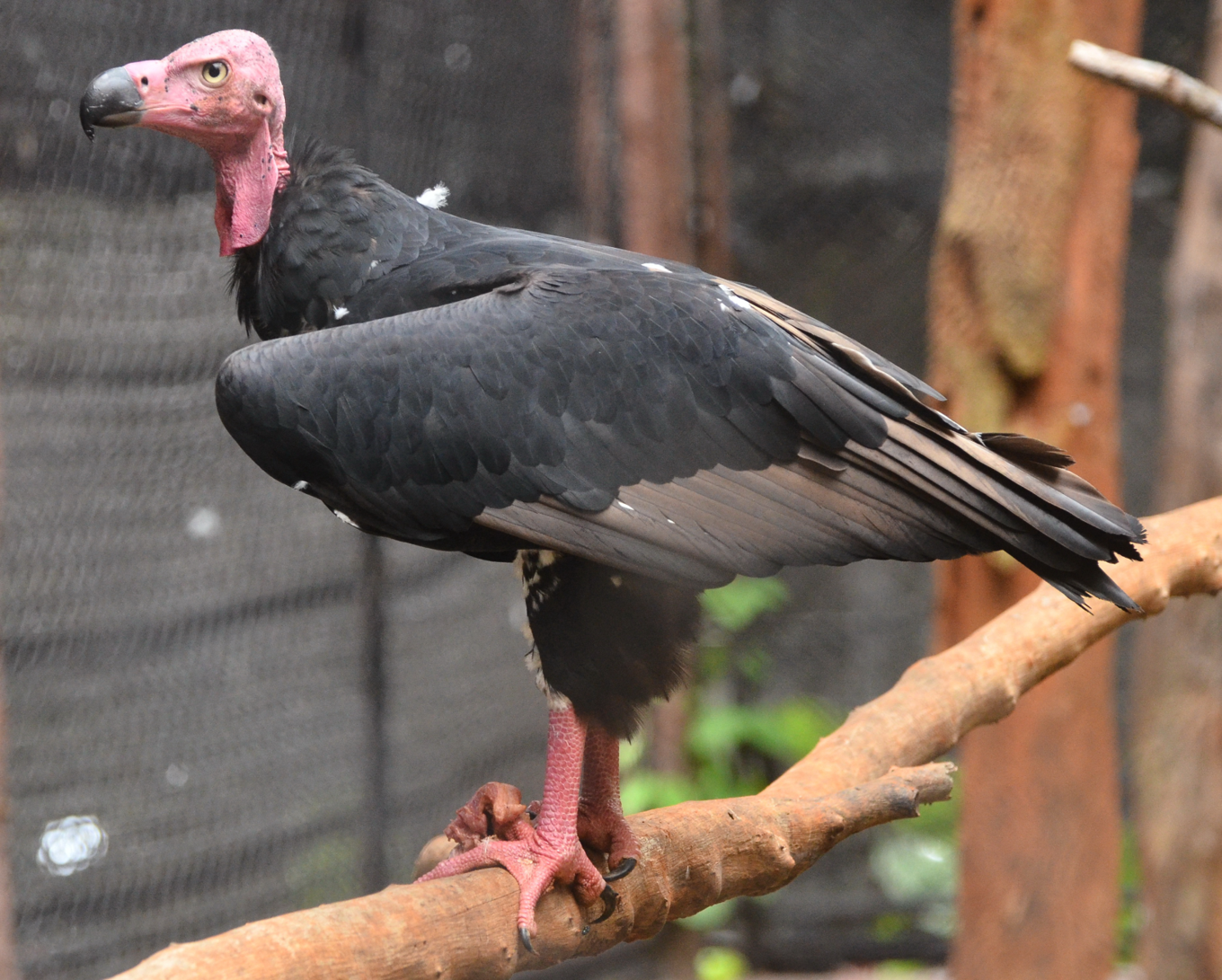
Male, side view

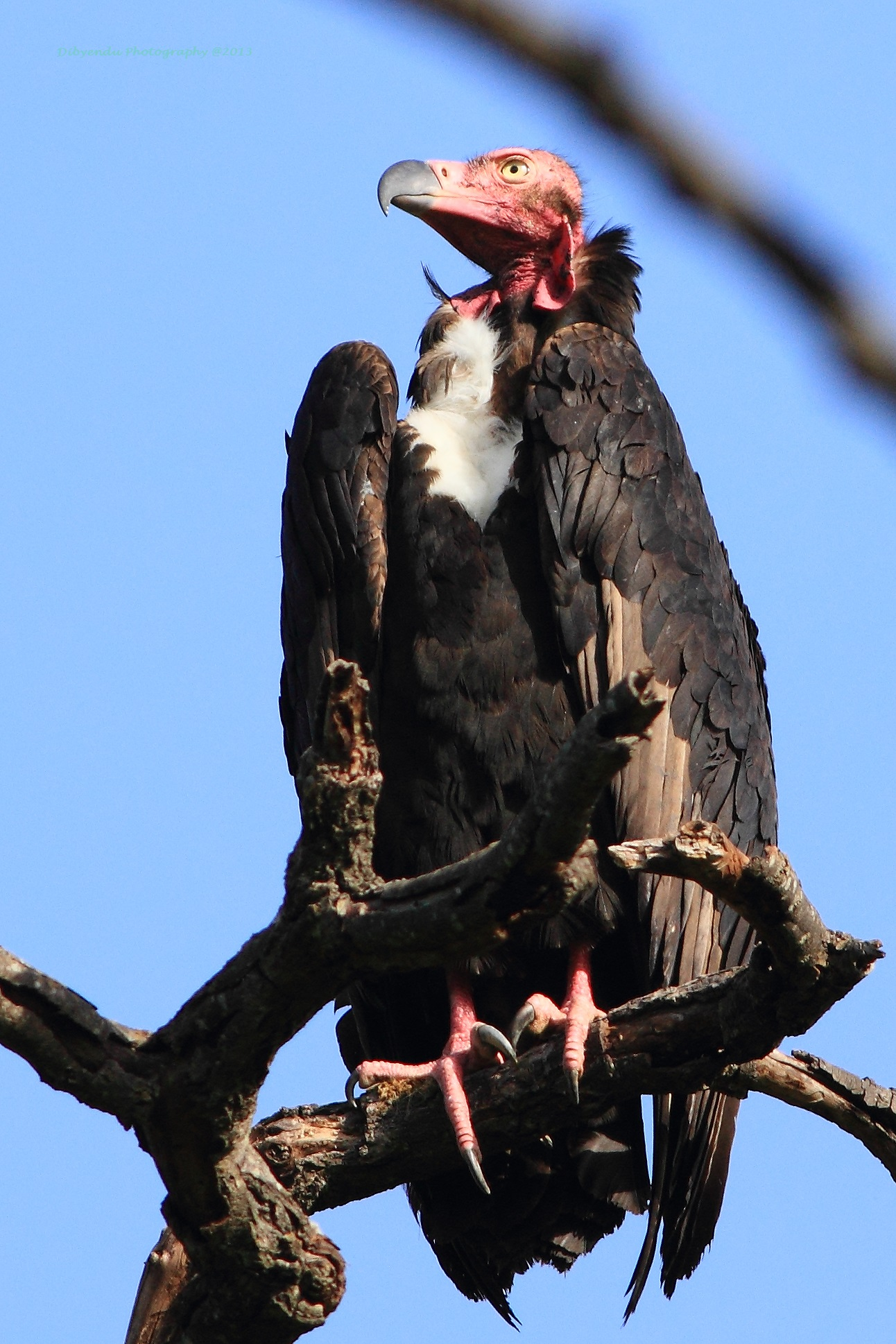
Male in Bandhavgarh National Park, India
