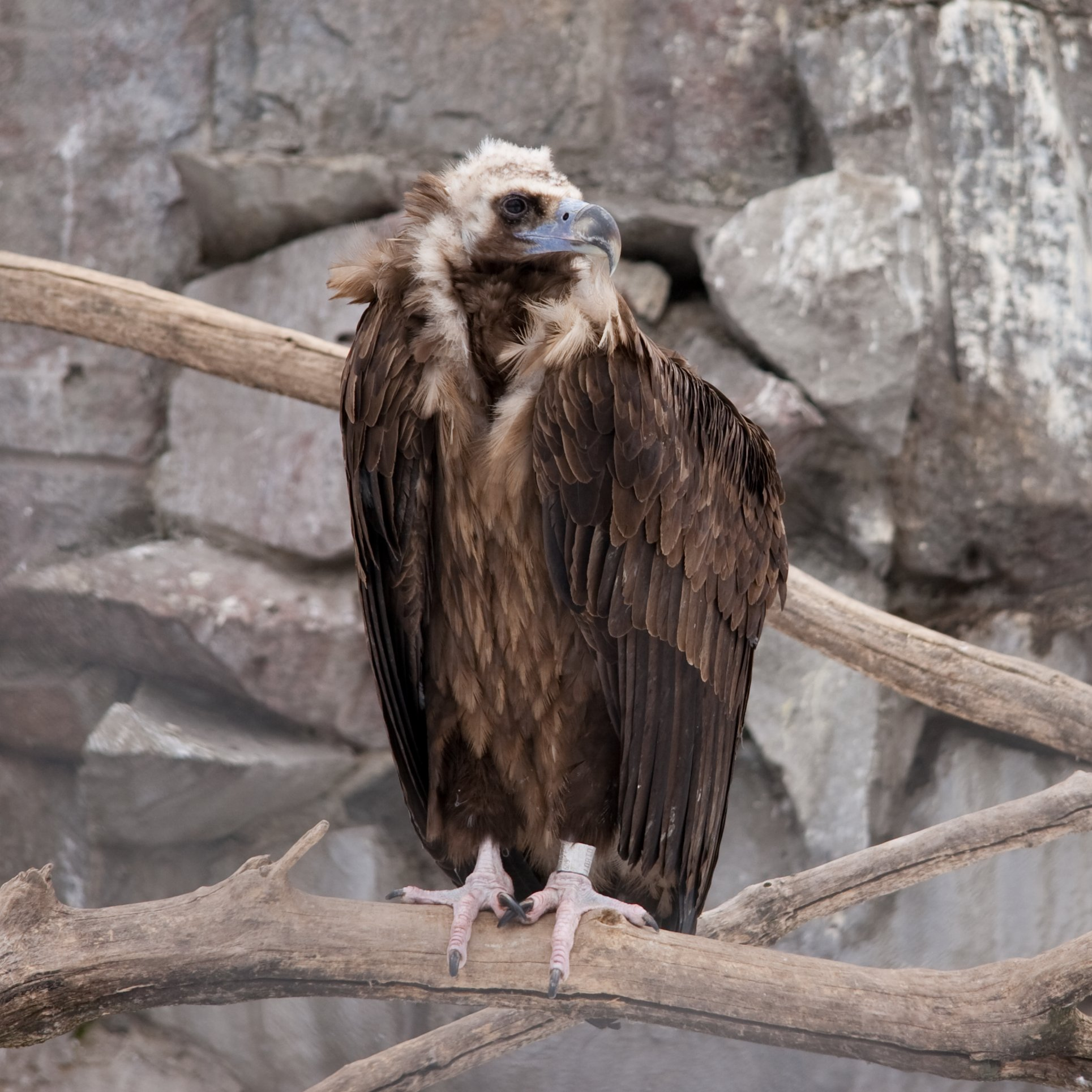
- Cinereous vulture, (Aegypius monachus)

Scientific classification
- Kingdom: Animalia
- Phylum: Chordata
- Class: Aves
- Order: Accipitriformes
- Family: Accipitridae
- Subfamily: Aegypiinae
- Genus: Aegypius; Savigny, 1809

Type species
- Vultur monachus Linnaeus, 1766

Species
- Aegypius monachus; †Aegypius jinniushanensis; †Aegypius prepyrenaicus

= Aegypius =

Genus of birds

Aegypius is a genus of Old World vultures found in the subfamily Aegypiinae. Of the three species in the genus, only the cinereous vulture is extant. The cinereous vulture (Aegypius monachus) is a creature that is hard to find as it is "a near threatened raptor that occurs in isolated populations across its range" (Çakmak). There were studies being conducted on the cinereous vulture and it indicates "that the Turkish birds hold, along with those from the Caucasus, an intermediate position between European (Balkan and Iberian) and North Asian (Mongolian) lineages" (Çakmak). The genus name Aegypius is a Greek word (αἰγυπιός) for 'vulture', or a bird not unlike one; Aelian describes the aegypius as "halfway between a vulture (gyps) and an eagle". Some authorities think this a good description of a lammergeier; others do not. Aegypius is the eponym of the species, whatever it was.

The only extant species from this genus is the cinereous vulture or Aegypius monachus. This vulture is one of the largest birds of prey and it plays a huge role in its various ecosystems by eating carcasses, and which in turn reduces the spread of diseases. The vultures are constantly exposed to many pathogens because of their eating habits. A study on the gastric and immune defense systems done in 2015, sequenced the entire genome of the cinereous genome. Comparing the vulture and the bald eagle, will allow the study to find positively selected genetic variations associated with respiration and the ability of the vulture's immune defense responses and gastric acid secretion to digest carcasses.
