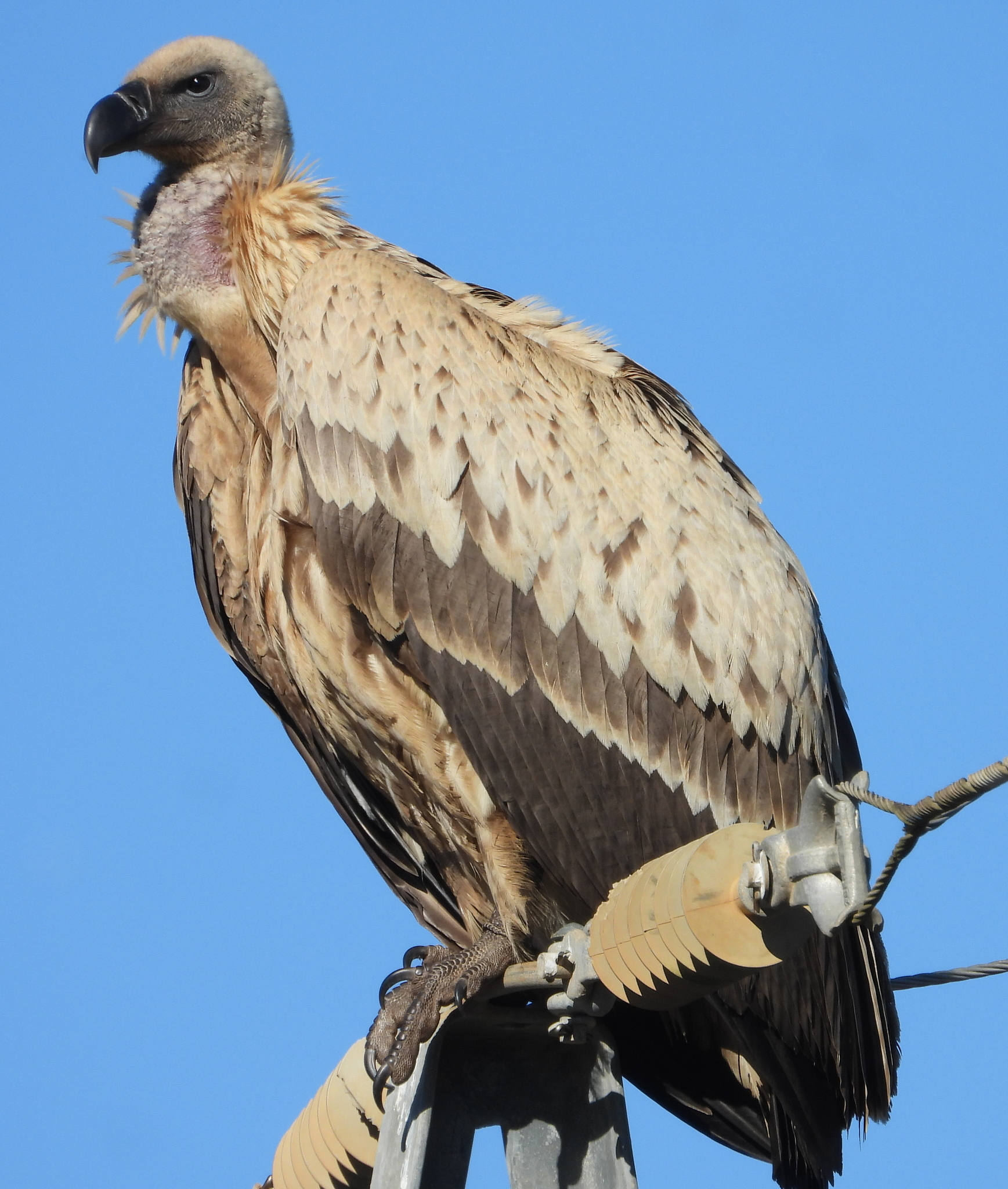
- De Hoop Nature Reserve in Overberg
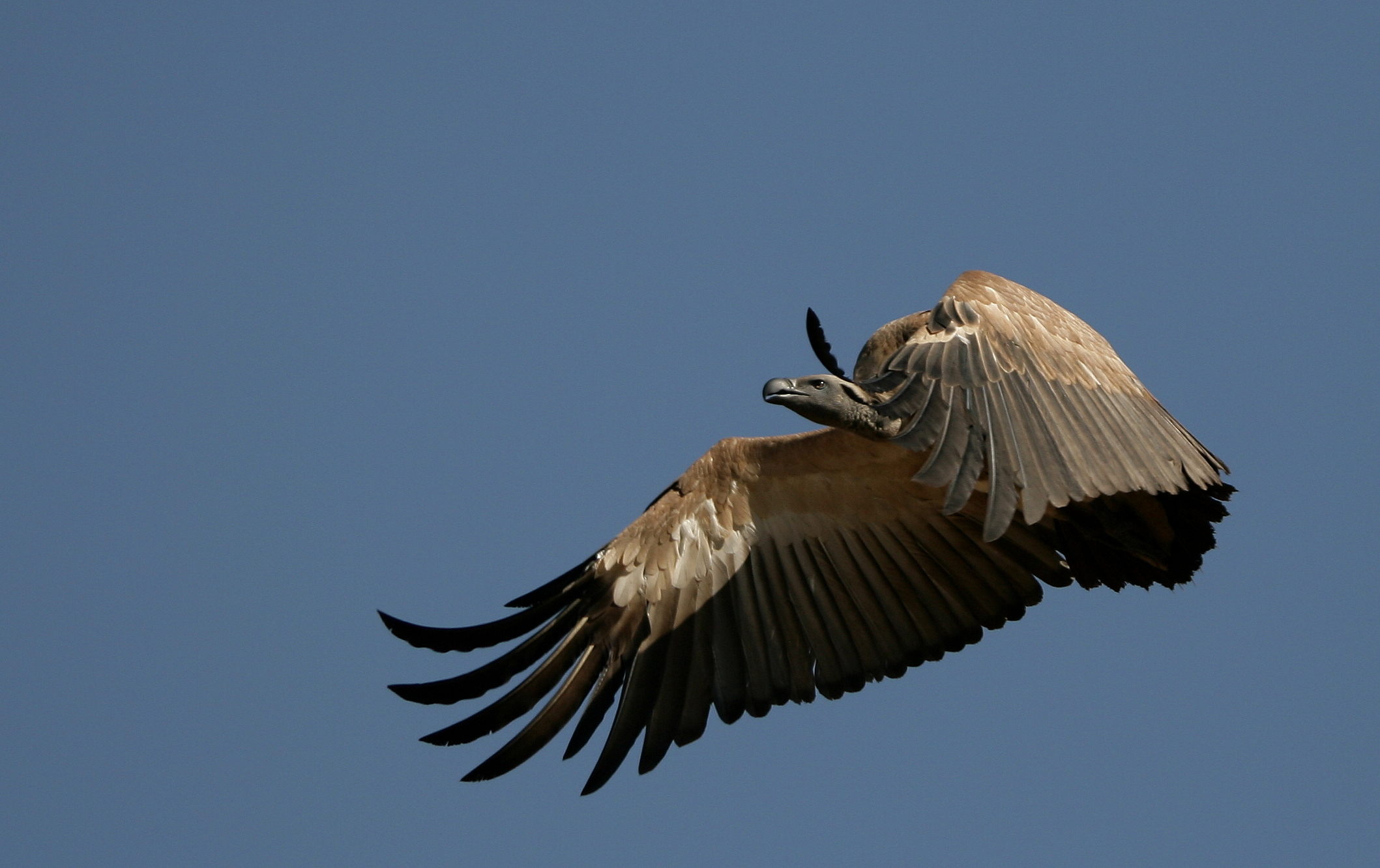
- A flying cape vulture at the Rhino and Lion Nature Reserve in Cradle of Humankind, Gauteng, South Africa

Conservation status
- Vulnerable (IUCN 3.1)

Scientific classification
- Kingdom: Animalia
- Phylum: Chordata
- Class: Aves
- Order: Accipitriformes
- Family: Accipitridae
- Genus: Gyps
- Species: G. coprotheres

Binomial name
- Gyps coprotheres (Forster, 1798)
- IUCN range (2021) Extant Extant (non-breeding) Possibly extinct Extinct

Synonyms
- Gyps kolbii

= Cape vulture =

Species of bird

The Cape vulture (Gyps coprotheres), also known as Cape griffon and Kolbe's vulture, is an Old World vulture in the family Accipitridae. It is endemic to southern Africa, and lives mainly in South Africa, Lesotho, Botswana, and in some parts of northern Namibia. It nests on cliffs and lays one egg per year. In 2015, it had been classified as Endangered on the IUCN Red List, but was down-listed to Vulnerable in 2021 as some populations increased and have been stable since about 2016.

== Description ==
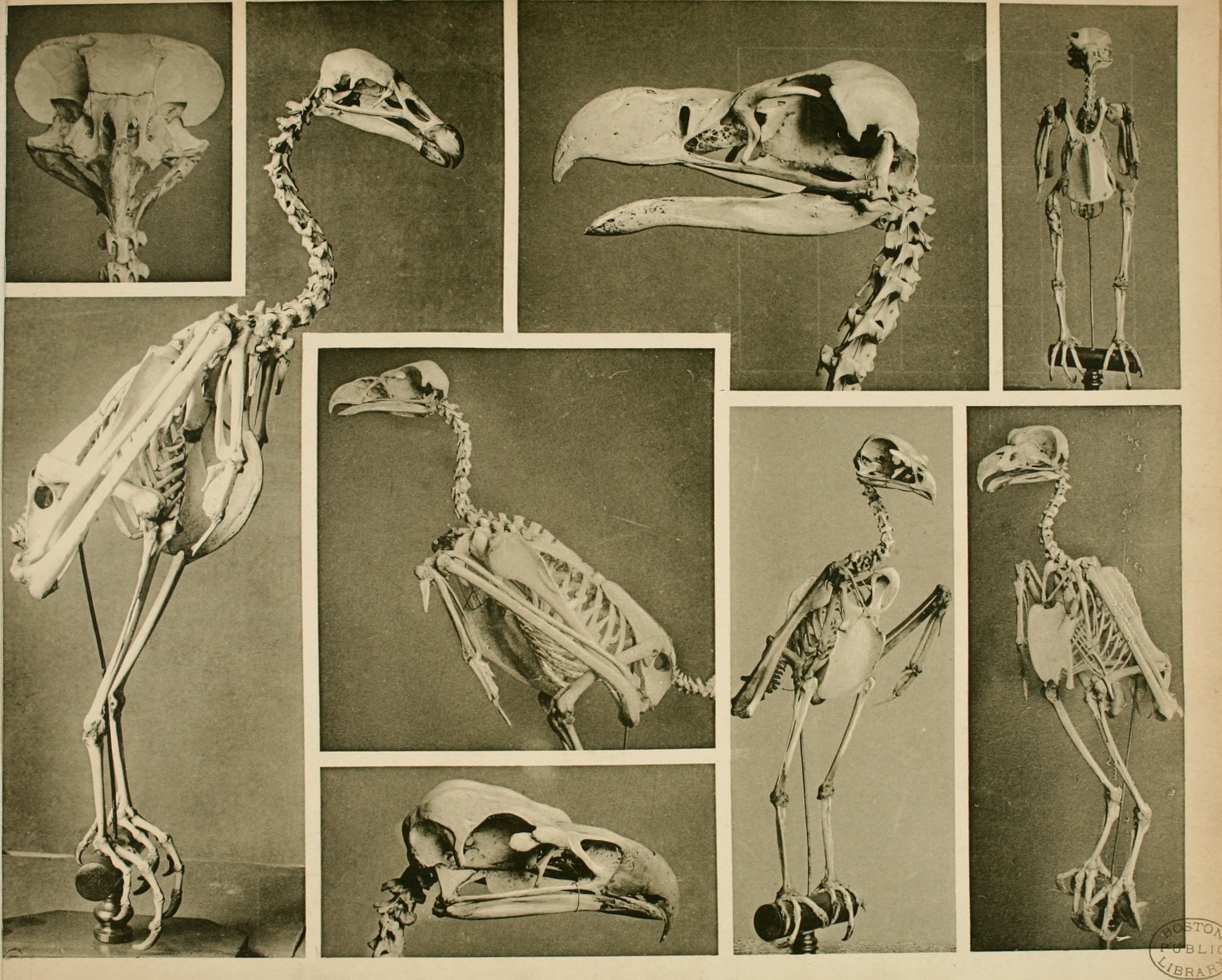
Illustration of a Cape vulture skeleton (1904)

This large vulture is of a creamy-buff colour, with contrasting dark flight and tail feathers. The adult is paler than the juvenile, and its underwing coverts can appear almost white at a distance. The head and neck are near-naked. The eyes are yellowish, and the bill is black. Juveniles and immatures are generally darker and more streaked, with brown to orange eyes and red necks. It closely resembles the white-backed vulture, however it is larger and has yellow irises.

The average length of adult vultures is about 96–115 cm (38–45 in) with a wingspan of 2.26–2.6 m (7 ft 5 in – 8 ft 6 in) and a body weight of 7–11 kg (15–24 lb). The two prominent bare skin patches at the base of the neck, also found in the white-backed vulture, are thought to be temperature sensors and used for detecting the presence of thermals. The species is among the largest raptors in Africa, next to the lappet-faced vulture. With a mean body mass of roughly 8.9 to 9.22 kg (19.6 to 20.3 lb), it appears to be significantly heavier than wild lappet-faced vultures, despite the latter's extremely large appearance, and rivals only a few other species, namely the great white pelican and kori bustard, as the largest flying bird native to Africa. After the Himalayan griffon vulture and the cinereous vulture, the Cape vulture is the third largest Old World vulture on average.

== Distribution and habitat ==
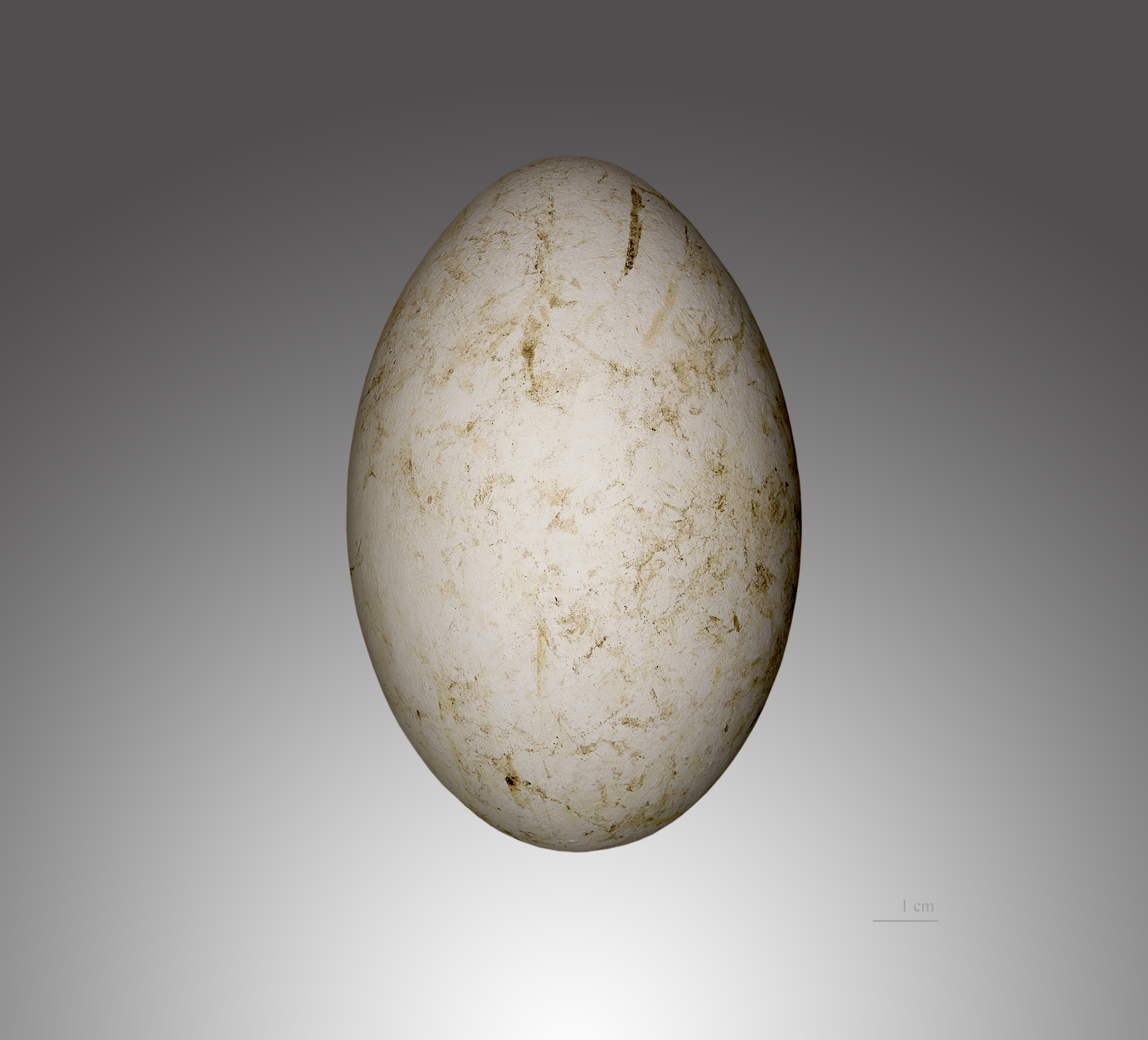
Egg

The Cape vulture is resident and breeding in Botswana, Lesotho, Mozambique and South Africa, but is vagrant in the Democratic Republic of the Congo and Zambia. It also occurs in Angola, Namibia, Zimbabwe and Eswatini but does not breed there. They are obligate scavengers, they feed on carrion, eating soft muscles and organ tissues and some bone fragments. They search for food in groups, and can spot carcasses from a long distance due to their good eyesight. They are able to locate the carcass quicker than other ground-dwelling scavengers.

== Behaviour and ecology ==
=== Breeding ===
It usually breeds and roosts on cliff faces in or near mountains, and has been recorded up to an elevation of 3,100 m (10,200 ft). In South Africa's Eastern Cape, Cape vultures were more likely to use nest sites on ledges with a smaller depth and at a higher elevation, surrounded by conspecifics. Tracked individuals in Namibia had home ranges of 11,800–22,500 km^{2} (4,600–8,700 sq mi). They also roost on trees and pylons. Additionally, juveniles and adults both prefer to roost on cliffs located closer to colonies. It is also believed that they tend to remain or return to the area of birth for breeding.

In Colleywobbles Vulture Colony in the Eastern Cape, South Africa, the fledglings had a mean post-fledging dependency period of 101 days, and the distance from the nest increased after this period, as the fledglings gained independence from their parents. Though they continue to breed, some populations have been recorded to have declined. Roberts' Farm in Magaliesberg, was abandoned as a breeding site in 2013.

== Conservation and threats ==
The Cape vulture has been declining steadily since at least the 1980s, when it was first categorised as Threatened. Between 1992 and 2007 the species declined by 60-70% in South Africa alone. By 2021, the total population size was estimated about 9,600 to 12,800 mature individuals, and it was assessed as Vulnerable.

The Cape vulture is considered to be impacted by a number of threats. A decrease in the amount of large carrion particularly during nesting, targeted or inadvertent poisoning, loss of foraging habitat, and unsustainable harvesting for traditional uses are thought to be the most important factors. A source of poisoning specific to many vultures, including the Cape vulture, is the drug Diclofenac and related compounds, which is used to treat arthritis in cattle, and which lead to kidney failure in vultures who consume carcasses of treated cattle. Electrocution resulting from collision with cables on electricity pylons is the most common cause of death in ringed birds.

On the 20th of June 2019, the carcasses of 468 white-backed vultures, 17 white-headed vultures, 28 hooded vultures, 14 lappet-faced vultures and 10 cape vultures, altogether 537 vultures, besides 2 tawny eagles, were found in northern Botswana. It is suspected that they died after eating the carcasses of 3 elephants that were poisoned by poachers, possibly to avoid detection by the birds, which help rangers to track poaching activity by circling above where there are dead animals.

Climate change has contributed as a threat for the endemic species, populations have decreased due to the high temperatures and global warming. There is still need to alter laws to achieve great conservation, as most laws in South Africa are implemented at a provincial scale. All vulture species can be elevated to 'Specially Protected' status to help increase their populations.

== Human wildlife conflict ==
There is still a need to deal with human-wildlife conflicts, farmers still need to be made aware of the effects of poisoning. In Namibia, 1.7% of communal farmers admitted to using poison in the year 2015. In Kenya, over 20% of farmers used poisons to eliminate predators and they were not aware of the Kenya Wildlife Act. It was then suggested that awareness campaigns should be implemented to reduce poisoning. In addition, a combination of top-down, e.g. legislation, and bottom-up such as corrals or compensation is expected to help reduce the problem.
