= Aegypius prepyrenaicus =

Aegypius prepyrenaicus Temporal range: Middle Pleistocene

Scientific classification
- Kingdom: Animalia
- Phylum: Chordata
- Class: Aves
- Order: Accipitriformes
- Family: Accipitridae
- Genus: Aegypius
- Species: A. prepyrenaicus

Binomial name
- Aegypius prepyrenaicus Carrasquilla, 2001

Extinct species of bird

Aegypius prepyrenaicus is an extinct Old World vulture which existed in what is now Spain during the Middle Pleistocene period. An ulna possibly referable to this species has been found in Gibraltar. It was described in 2001 by F. Hernandez Carrasquilla.

A study in 2009 argued that the type specimen ulna could belong to several other species, and so that A. prepyrenaicus should be considered a Nomen dubium.
