= Aegypius jinniushanensis =

Aegypius jinniushanensis Temporal range: Middle Pleistocene

Scientific classification
- Kingdom: Animalia
- Phylum: Chordata
- Class: Aves
- Order: Accipitriformes
- Family: Accipitridae
- Genus: Aegypius
- Species: A. jinniushanensis

Binomial name
- Aegypius jinniushanensis Zhang et al., 2012

Extinct species of bird

Aegypius jinniushanensis is an extinct Old World vulture which existed in what is now China during the Middle Pleistocene period. It was described by Zhang Zihui, Yunping Huang, Helen F. James and Lianhai Hou in 2012.
