= Sub-Himalayan Range =

Mountains in India

The Sub-Himalayan Range (also known as the Cis-Himalaya) is the southernmost mountains in the Himalayas, located on the Indian subcontinent. Their average height varies between 600 and 1,200 meters, and are not so high in altitude as compared to other mountain ranges in the Himalayan range. The range spans the modern-day countries of Pakistan, India, Nepal, and Bhutan.

Himalayan foothills form the sub-Himalayan zone. Located from the Punjab to the Indian state of Assam. These hills are consist of a narrow belt of folded neogene molasse type sediments (siwaliks). Southward, the folded siwaliks sequence is covered by Indo-Gangetic Plain alluvium. An acute fault is "Himalayan front fault" cut the alluvium in foothill region, this fault is a series of en-echelon faults which are parallel to the strike of the hills between the Punjab and Assam. Northward, this sequence is terminated by MBT, which is a set of north dipping faults and forms the boundary between Southern Himalayas and Lesser Himalayas. The Sivalik Hills and sub‐Himalayan region is home to the Soanian archaeological culture.
