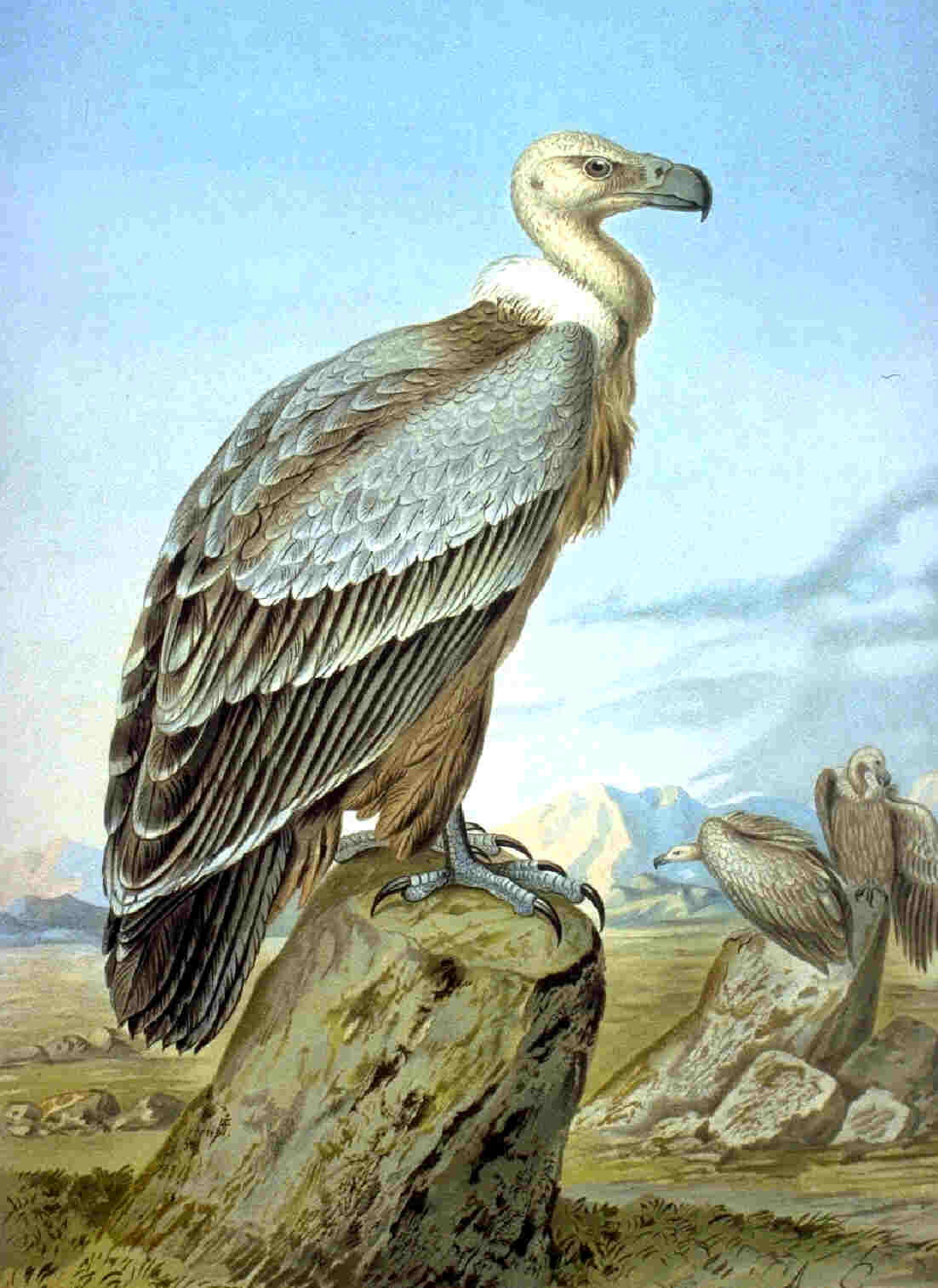
- Gyps fulvus from Naumann, Natural history of the birds of central Europe, 3rd ed. 1899

Scientific classification
- Kingdom: Animalia
- Phylum: Chordata
- Class: Aves
- Order: Accipitriformes
- Family: Accipitridae
- Subfamily: Aegypiinae
- Genus: Gyps; Savigny, 1809

Type species
- Gyps vulgaris = Vultur fulvus Savigny, 1809

Species
- 8 extant, 2 extinct; see text.

= Gyps =

Genus of birds

Gyps is a genus of Old World vultures that was proposed by Marie Jules César Savigny in 1809. Its members are sometimes known as griffon vultures. Gyps vultures have a slim head, a long slender neck with downy feathers, and a ruff around the neck formed by long buoyant feathers. The crown of their big beaks is a little compressed, and their big dark nostrils are set transverse to the beak. They have six or seven wing feathers, of which the first is the shortest and the fourth the longest.

== Taxonomy ==
The genus Gyps was introduced in 1809 by the French zoologist Marie Jules César Savigny to accommodate the Eurasian griffon vulture. The genus name is from Ancient Greek gups meaning "vulture". The genus contains eight extant species.

Image	Name	Distribution and IUCN Red List status
	Eurasian griffon vulture G. fulvus (Hablitz, 1783)	LC
	White-rumped vulture G. bengalensis (Gmelin, 1788)	India and Nepal, Pakistan; CR
	Cape vulture G. coprotheres (Forster, 1798)	Southern Africa VU
	Indian vulture G. indicus (Scopoli, 1786)	Pakistan, India and Nepal; CR
	Slender-billed vulture G. tenuirostris Gray, 1844	India; CR
	Rüppell's vulture G. rueppelli (Brehm, 1852)	Sahel and East Africa; CR
	White-backed vulture G. africanus Salvadori, 1865	West and center, East, Southern Africa; CR
	Himalayan vulture G. himalayensis Hume, 1869	NT

Two fossil species have been described:

- † Maltese vulture G. melitensis Lydekker, 1890 – Fossil remains were found in Middle to Late Pleistocene sites all over the central and eastern Mediterranean.
- † G. bochenskii Boev, 2010 – Fossil remains were found near Varshets in northwestern Bulgaria that were dated to the Late Pliocene.
