= Saving Asia's Vultures from Extinction =

Nonprofit organization

SAVE
- Saving Asia's Vultures from Extinction
- Abbreviation: SAVE
- Type: Conservation charity
- Purpose: Wildlife conservation
- Region served: South Asia, Southeast Asia
- Key people: Chris Bowden; Mary Davies
- Website: save-vultures.org

SAVE (Saving Asia's Vultures from Extinction) is a consortium of conservation groups focused on vulture conservation in Asia. Established with support from key organizations, including the Royal Society for the Protection of Birds (RSPB), SAVE aims to enhance coordination and unify conservation efforts across the region.

== History ==
SAVE was created in 2011 with significant input from organizations such as the Royal Society for the Protection of Birds (RSPB), which funded the position of SAVE Programme Manager. This role, held by an external coordinator, was important for organizing annual meetings and managing activities. Professors Ian Newton and David Houston, both noted raptor conservationists, served as chairs. An initial manifesto outlining the consortium’s goals was developed and endorsed by the founding partners. The consortium’s profile was raised through launch events in Delhi and Kathmandu.

SAVE has held annual meetings with 40-50 attendees, expanded from 14 to 20 partners, and developed a regional action plan called the Blueprint for the Recovery of Asia’s Critically Endangered Gyps Vultures, updated annually. The consortium has initiated research programs on NSAIDs in cattle, vulture population monitoring, and post-mortem protocols. It also facilitated the creation of the Government Regional Steering Committee and the Delhi Declaration.

In 2014, it was reported that a SAVE program aimed to release up to 25 captive-bred vultures into a 30,000-square-kilometer "safe zone" by 2016. This initiative followed the ban of diclofenac, a veterinary drug identified as causing severe declines in vulture populations. SAVE has prioritized establishing these safe zones and has identified six such areas, some spanning across Nepal, Pakistan, and Bangladesh. The program also focuses on grassroots advocacy and education to remove diclofenac from the environment and has set up captive-breeding centers in Nepal, Pakistan, and India to support reintroduction efforts. In 2024, it was reported that the group was achieving some success in establishing "vulture safe" zones, primarily through a combination of enforcement and public education initiatives, especially in Nepal. SAVE has employed innovative methods like double laying and egg swapping, alongside traditional captive breeding and reintroduction efforts, to enhance vulture populations and genetic diversity.

SAVE’s efforts are credited with significantly reducing diclofenac use. Advocacy efforts led by the coalition have resulted in bans on the drug and, in some areas, other NSAIDs identified as harmful to vultures. Through SAVE, researchers have facilitated capacity building in South Asia by collaborating with experts in Germany and India to develop a cost-effective diclofenac test using ELISA (enzyme-linked immunosorbent assay) technology. A 2024 report from the group revealed that vulture populations in India, which had faced severe declines, had stabilized after decades. This recovery is largely credited to the government’s ban on the veterinary use of diclofenac.

== Structure ==
SAVE is a coalition of regional and international conservation NGOs, research institutes, and government agencies, collaborating closely with governments. According to SAVE, the SAVE Board consists of one representative from each Core partner and is chaired by a Chairperson elected for a four-year term. The Chairperson, who may or may not be a current Board or partner member, is responsible for leading Board meetings and collaborating with the SAVE Advisor and Coordinator to set discussion priorities.

SAVE includes three categories of partners: Core Partners, who play a key role in implementing actions and hold seats on the SAVE Board; Project Partners, who are significant organizations working in the region; and Associate Partners, which are local organizations involved in specific actions and invited on a renewable two-year basis. A proposed category for Supporting Partners, intended for major donors, has not been utilized. Government institutions that contribute to SAVE’s priorities are acknowledged but not always featured on SAVE documents. SAVE operates through two main committees: the Technical Advisory Committee (TAC), which provides expert advice, and the Fundraising, Advocacy, and Communications Committee (FACC), which handles fundraising and advocacy.

According to their website, the SAVE partnership includes five membership categories: Core Partners, essential for the program’s success, such as BirdLife International, WWF–Pakistan, and Bombay Natural History Society; Government Partners, like the Bangladesh Forest Department, involved in implementing SAVE’s Blueprint actions; Research Partners, including the University of the Highlands and Islands and Indian Council of Agricultural Research, focusing on key research priorities; Affiliate Partners, which contribute to SAVE’s activities at a lower level; and Associates, local or regional partners committed to SAVE’s goals.

== Challenges ==
SAVE faces challenges such as heavy reliance on RSPB for funding and coordination, inadequate veterinary drug regulations in vulture-range countries, and perceptions of external influence. The consortium is addressing concerns about exclusivity, which are partly mitigated by the Associate Partner category, but remain a challenge in the diverse South and Southeast Asian region.

== See also ==
- Indian vulture crisis
- Gyps
- Jatayu Conservation Breeding Centre
- African vulture crisis
