= African vulture crisis =

Ecological disaster in Africa

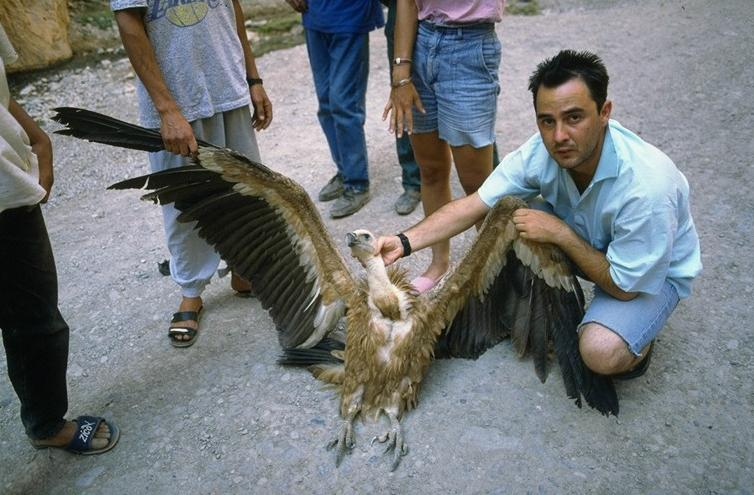
A poisoned Eurasian griffon found in the Moroccan Atlas Mountains, 1991

The African vulture crisis is the ongoing collapse in the populations of several Old World vulture species across Africa. Steep population declines have been reported from many locations across the continent since the early 2000s. The causes are mainly poisoning from baited animal carcasses, and the illegal trade in vulture body parts for traditional medicine. A study in 2024 revealed that not only were vulture declines underestimated, but that other large African birds of prey experienced similarly severe reductions in their population. Available data suggest that the African vulture crisis may be similar in scale to the Indian vulture crisis, but more protracted and less well documented.

== Causes ==
=== Poisoning ===
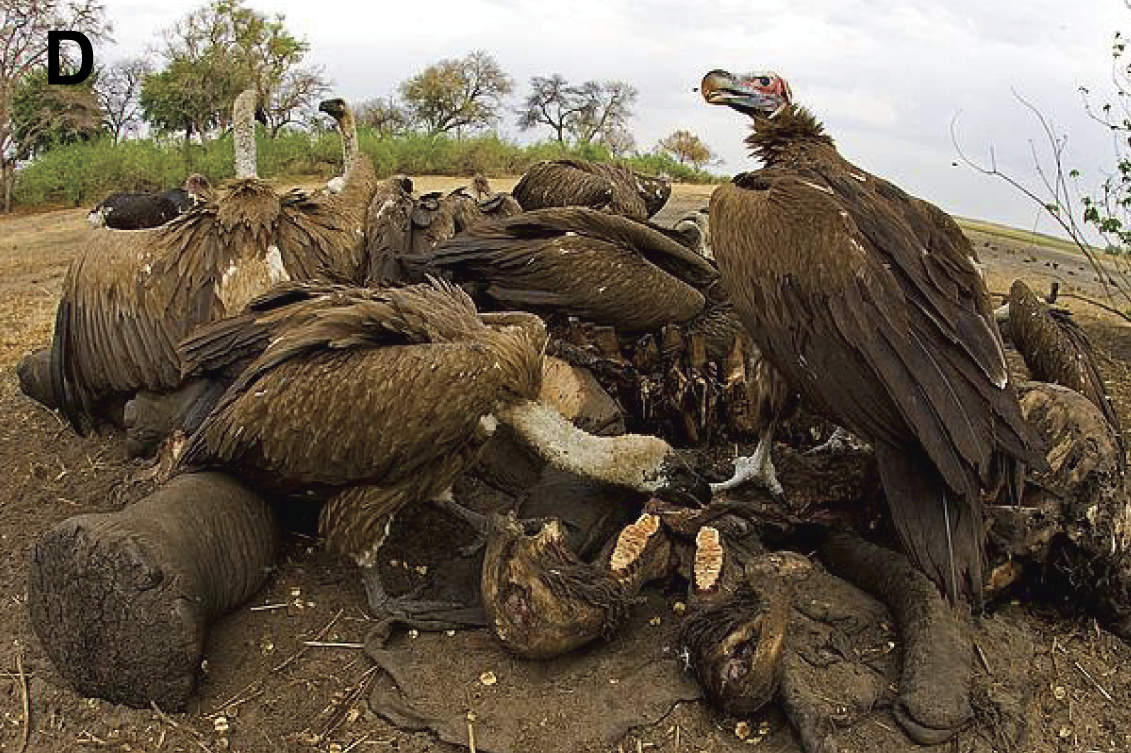
Several vultures may gather to feed on a large carcass. Poisoning may kill hundreds.

The main driver of vulture declines is poisoning. Animal carcasses may be poisoned with toxic pesticide. This may be from deliberate targeting of vultures—for example, poachers of elephants and rhinos will target vultures to eliminate their tell-tale overhead circling that might expose their illegal activities. Carcasses are also poisoned to kill carnivores blamed for predation of livestock, herbivores blamed for crop destruction and to control feral dog numbers.

Vultures are particularly vulnerable to poisoning because of their foraging behaviors and life history traits. They are obligate scavengers that primarily consume animal carcasses and waste products. Most vulture species forage in large groups, so many individual birds may be poisoned by a single carcass. Even if a poisoned carcass does not kill vultures it can have a harmful effect. Sublethal exposure can affect their reproductive success, behavior, physical characteristics, and immune response. Their long life spans and high trophic level also make them vulnerable to bioaccumulation of poisons over time, and their slow reproduction means a single poisoned carcass can easily undo years or decades of conservation efforts.

=== Trade in body parts for traditional medicine ===
Vulture body parts are used in some cultures to treat physical and mental illnesses. The prices of vulture meat and body parts have been rising, possibly due to an increased demand for these products or a reduced supply of vultures. The African Vulture trade for belief uses varies in importance across the continent with different African cultures participating or not depending on the value of body parts and meat to their traditional medicinal practices. The current level of trade is not sustainable and is contributing to the decline of vulture populations.

=== Electrocution ===
Vulture collisions with energy infrastructure and electrocution are relatively common, especially in southern and northern Africa. Efforts to meet United Nations Sustainable Development Goals have led to expansion of electrification programs. However, these do not always implement bird-safe designs that would limit the risks of electrocution and collision.

=== Other causes ===
Other threats that contribute to the decline in African vulture populations include habitat degradation and fragmentation, disturbance of nest sites, declines in vulture food supply, and bushmeat consumption by humans. Vulture deaths have also been caused by them visiting wells to drink then becoming waterlogged and drowning. In one incident in Morocco, 15 Eurasian griffons drowned in a well.

== Regions affected ==
=== North Africa ===
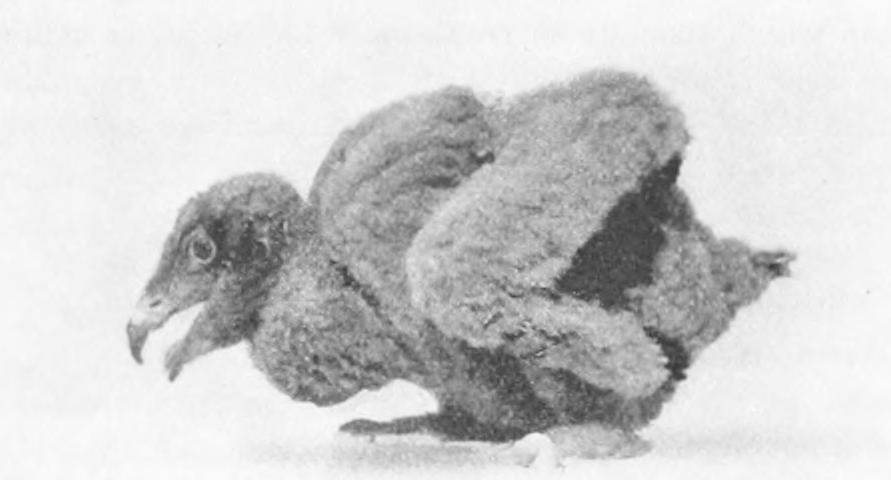
A lammergeier nestling from Algeria

Excluding vagrants, three vulture species still exist in North Africa: the griffon vulture, lammergeier, and Egyptian vulture. Two other species (the cinereous vulture and lappet-faced vulture) have now died out from the region.

The Egyptian vulture is found across North Africa, while the Eurasian griffon is restricted to the Atlas Mountains. The lammergeier is eradicated from the region except Morocco, where it is considered critically endangered.

The most affected species is the Eurasian griffon, though it is apparently common in much of Europe and Asia. Many poisonings in the region are attributed to the use of strychnine, which is heavily regulated by the Moroccan government.

=== West Africa ===
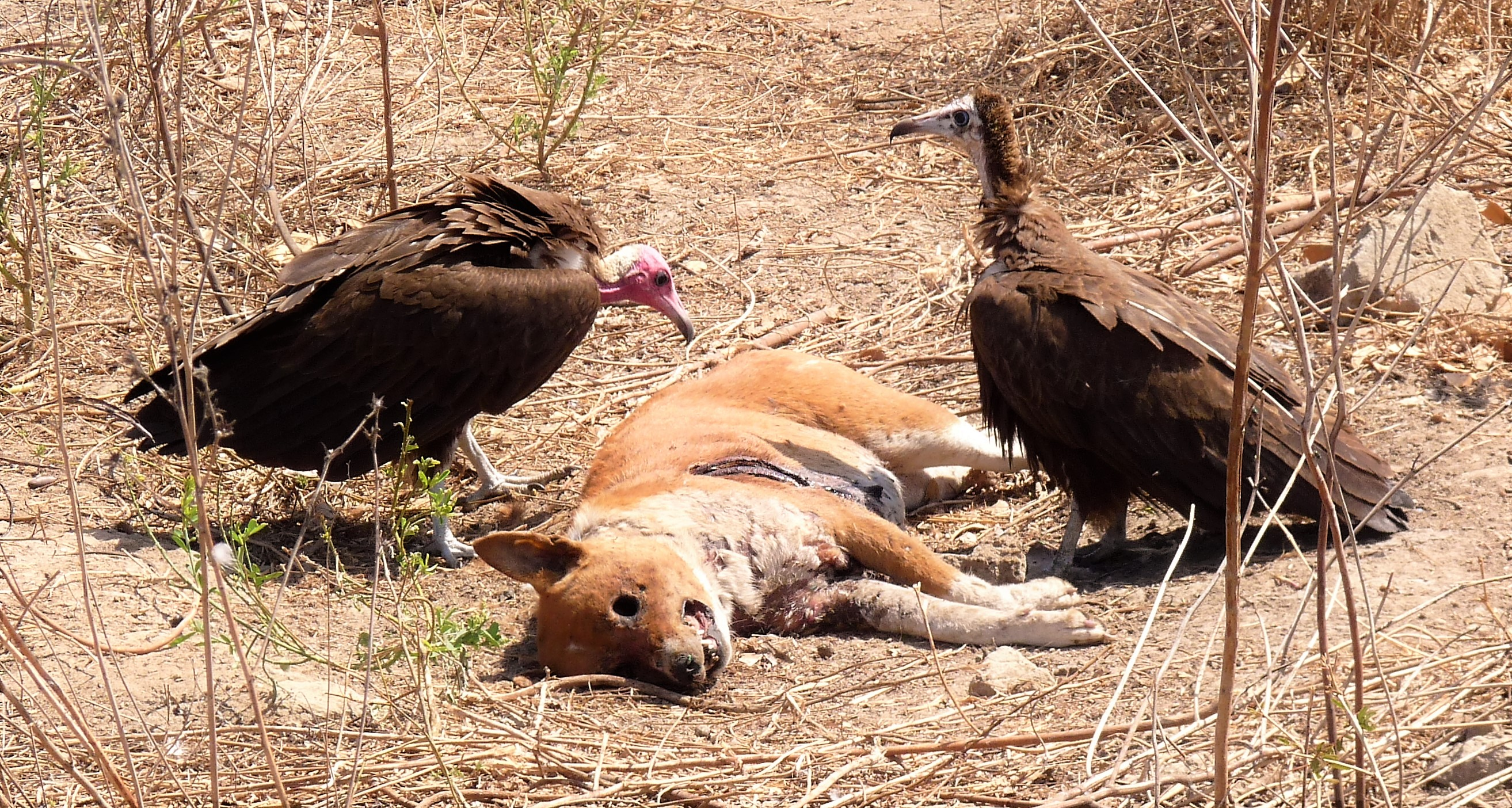
Two hooded vultures feeding on a dead dog in Gambia. Their importance in their ecological niche is ridding it of corpses

Seven vulture species live in West African countries: the Egyptian vulture, hooded vulture, lappet-faced vulture, palm-nut vulture, Rüppell's vulture, white-backed vulture and white-headed vulture.

West Africa saw some of the largest decreases in vulture numbers, with up to 61% of vultures inside parks and 70% outside parks disappearing in the 30 years between 1970 and 2000. Some populations have declined by almost 97%. In 2020, around 50 hooded vultures were poisoned in Gambia, and between September 2019 and March 2020, 2000 were killed in Guinea-Bissau for traditional medicine. Conservation programs were initiated in these countries and in Senegal, surveying the vulture populations and raising public awareness.

=== Southern Africa ===
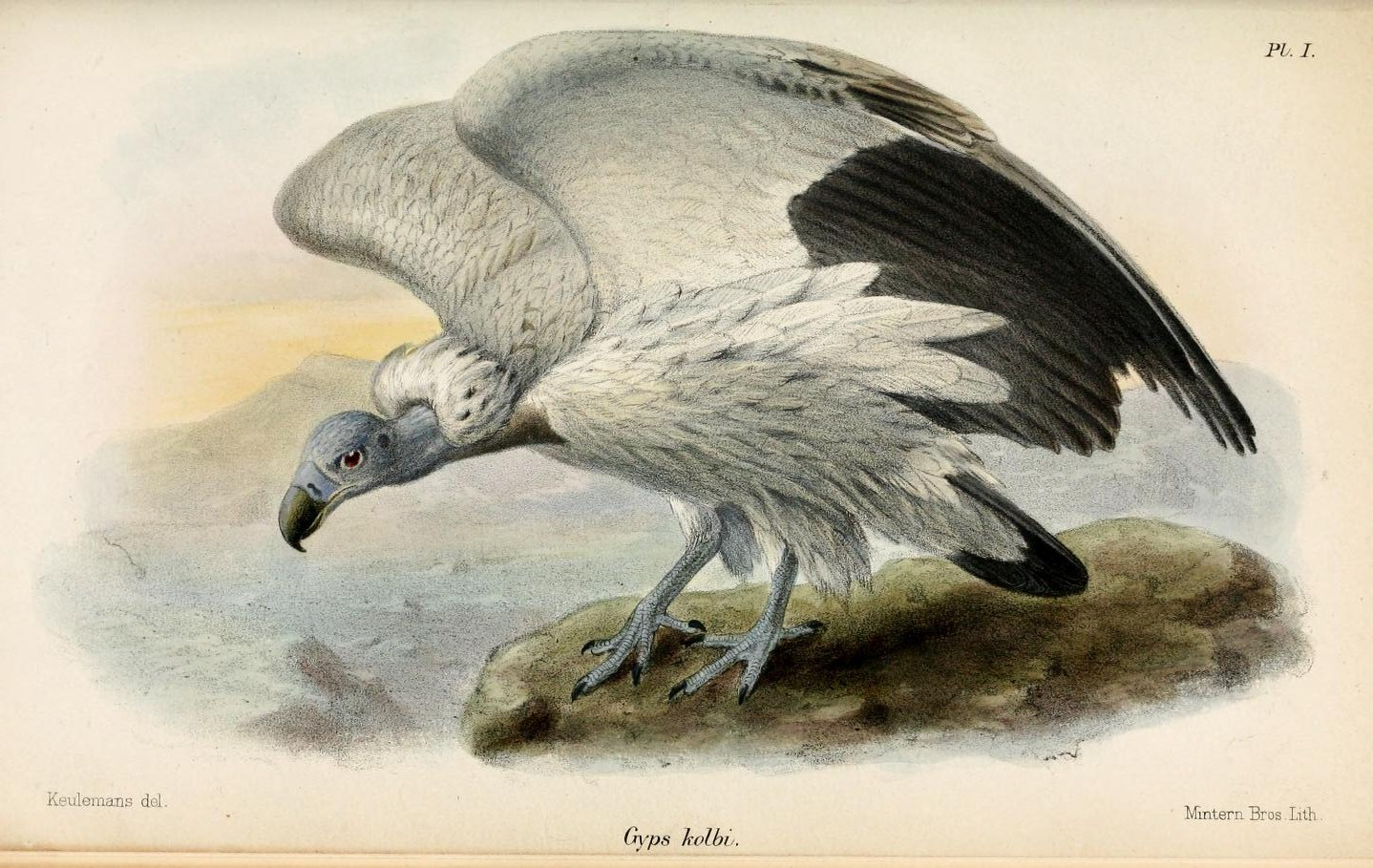
The endemic cape vulture

Southern Africa has the highest species diversity of vultures in the continent, comprising nine species which are the aforementioned Egyptian vulture, bearded vulture, hooded vulture, white-backed vulture, white-headed vulture, Rüppell's griffon vulture, lappet-faced vulture, palmnut vulture and the endemic Cape Vulture.

Whilst conservation action has been taking place in the region, the sporadic nature of poisonings and their large death count have dealt heavy blows to vultures in the region.

A recent incident in Kruger National Park involved the poisoned carcass of an African buffalo somewhere in mid-August 2022. It was estimated that 104 White-backed vultures were fatally poisoned, while 20 were harmed. A hyena had also succumbed from the poisoning. It was believed that the poisoning was intentional to collect vulture parts. Currently, the number of white-backed vultures sits at about 7,500 individuals, down from a population that numbered tens of thousands.

The deadliest instance of poisoning occurred in Chobe National Park, Botswana in 2019, involving the carcasses of three poisoned African bush elephants. A total of 537 vultures were killed, 468 white-backed vultures, 28 hooded vultures, 17 white-headed vultures, 14 lappet-faced vultures, and 10 cape vultures. Furthermore, 2 tawny eagles succumbed to the poison.

== Consequences and implications ==
Vultures play an essential ecological role in Africa. As a primary scavenger they contribute to the destruction of harmful pathogens and removal of decaying corpses form the environment, which may limit water contamination and the spread of disease from animal carcasses. Falls in vulture numbers in India led to increased numbers of feral dogs and increased rabies incidence, showing a potential threat for human health in Africa.

== Affected species ==
The decline rates in this table are based on a 2024 study of population trends over three generations. Alongside vultures, other large birds of prey have also suffered extreme declines.

Image	Common name	Binomial name	Population trends	Status (IUCN assessment)	Recommended status by Nature Ecology & Evolution
	Hooded vulture	Necrosyrtes monachus	Range-wide declines of 67% in the last three generations	Critically endangered	Endangered
	Rüppell's vulture	Gyps ruppellii	Population declined by 97% in the last three generations	Critically endangered	-
	White-backed vulture	Gyps africanus	Declined by 81.8-89.6% in the last three generations, with an average decline of 86%.	Critically endangered	-
	Cape vulture	Gyps coprotheres	Declined by 60-70% from 1992 to 2007, however there have been recent increases in some breeding populations	Vulnerable	-
	Lappet-faced vulture	Torgos tracheliotos	Declined by 88-92% over the last three generations in Africa. Arabian populations appear to be stable.	Endangered	Critically endangered
	White-headed vulture	Trigonoceps occipitalis	Declined by 85.6-93% in the last three generations.	Critically endangered	-
	Egyptian vulture	Neophron percnopterus	91% declines in Africa during the last three generations, about 10% in Europe, stable in the southern Middle East. The biggest declines were recorded in India, owing to the Indian vulture crisis	Endangered	-
	Secretarybird	Sagittarius serpentarius	Declined by 85% over the last three generations.	Endangered	Critically endangered
	Scissor-tailed kite	Chelictinia riocourii	Declined by 48% over the last three generations.	Vulnerable	Endangered
	Beaudouin's snake eagle	Circaetus beaudouni	Declined by 80-85% over the last three generations.	Vulnerable	Critically endangered
	Brown snake eagle	Circaetus cinereus	Declined by 52-57% over the last three generations.	Least concern	Endangered
	Bateleur	Terathopius ecaudatus	Declined by 77-93% over the last three generations.	Endangered	Critically endangered
	African harrier-hawk	Polyboroides typus	Declined by 53-61% over the last three generations.	Least concern	Endangered
	Dark chanting-goshawk	Melierax metabates	Declined by 41% over the last three generations.	Least concern	Vulnerable
	Grasshopper buzzard	Butastur rufipennis	Declined by 29-34.4% over the last three generations.	Least concern	Vulnerable
	Augur buzzard	Buteo augur	Declined by 78% over the last three generations.	Least concern	Critically endangered
	African hawk-eagle	Aquila spilogaster	Declined by 91% over the last three generations.	Least concern	Critically endangered
	Wahlberg's eagle	Hieraeetus wahlbergi	Declined by 62-81.9% over the last three generations.	Least concern	Endangered
	Martial eagle	Polemaetus bellicosus	Declined by 84-93.6% over the last three generations.	Endangered	Critically endangered
	Long-crested eagle	Lophaetus occipitalis	Declined by 79% over the last three generations.	Least concern	Critically endangered
