= Indian vulture crisis =

Ecological crisis in Indian subcontinent

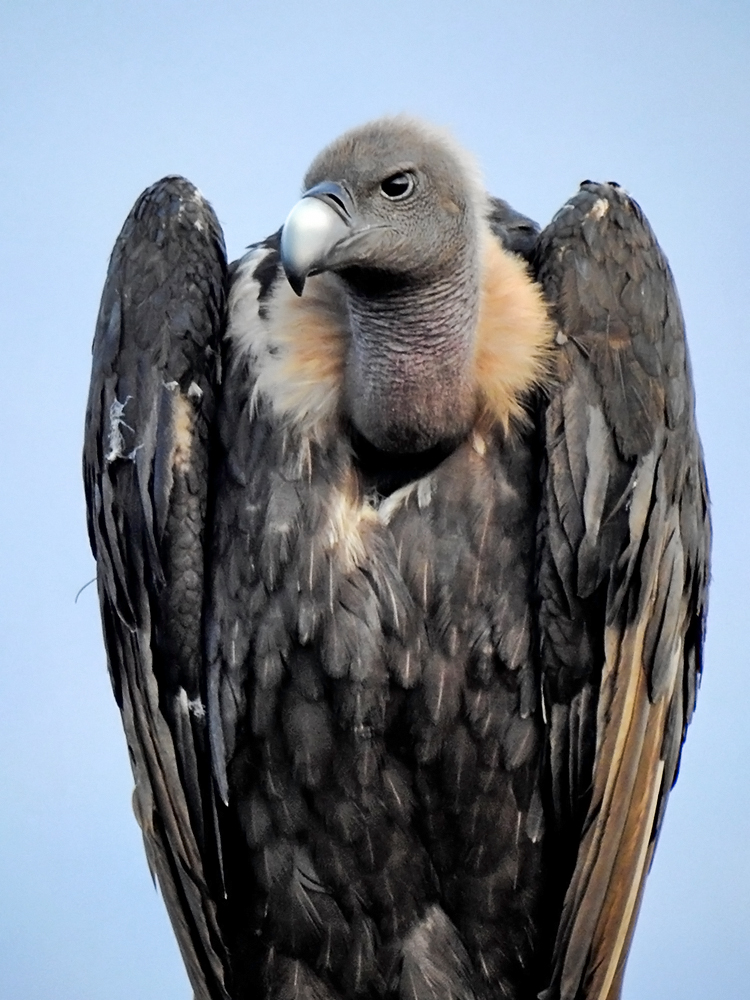
The white-rumped vulture, one of the species devastated in the crisis

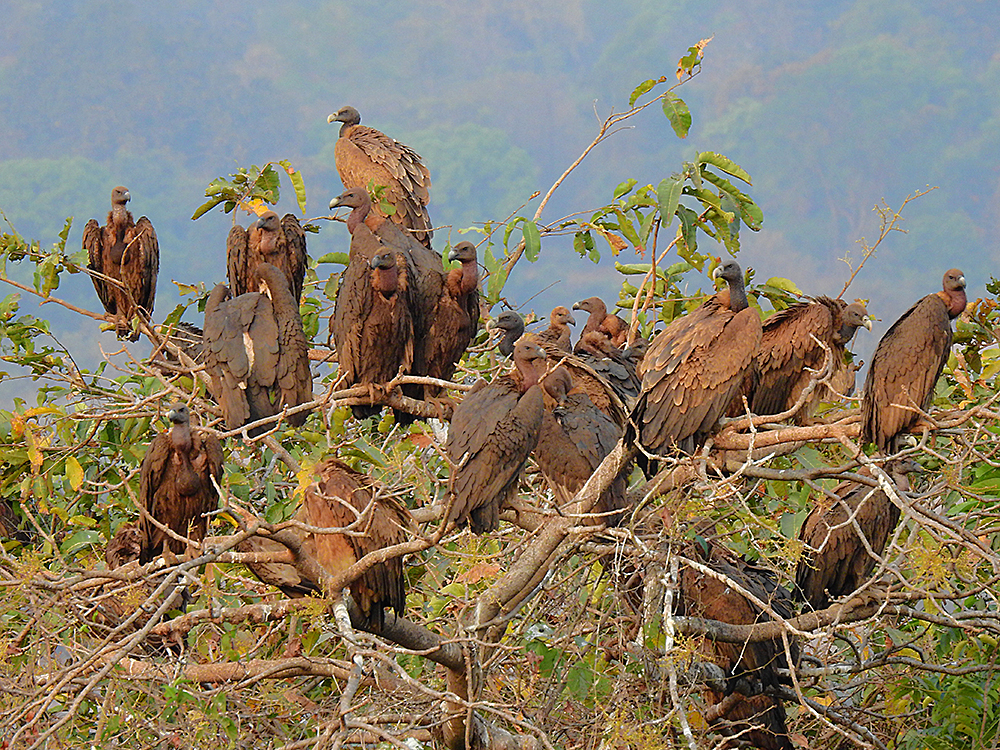
A flock of endangered white-rumped and Indian vultures

Fifteen species of vulture can be found living in India, but most are now endangered after a rapid and major population collapse exceeding 99.5% in recent decades. In the early 1980s, three species of Gyps vultures (the white-rumped vulture, the long-billed vulture and the slender-billed vulture) had a combined estimated population of 40 million in South Asia, while in 2017 the total population numbered only 19,000 (6,000, 12,000, and 1,000 respectively).

A major contributing factor in declining populations of vultures is believed to be the widespread use of drugs such as diclofenac, a nonsteroidal anti-inflammatory drug (NSAID) once commonly given to livestock. The drug is believed to have been passed onto the vultures through the flesh of dead cattle who were given diclofenac in their last days of life, which then causes kidney failure in vultures. Data modelling revealed that a tiny proportion (about 0.8%) of livestock carcasses containing diclofenac can cause significant crashes in vulture populations.

Without vultures, a large number of animal carcasses were left to rot, posing a serious risk to human health by providing a potential breeding ground for infectious germs and proliferation of pests such as rats. The loss of vultures also resulted in a substantial increase in the population of feral dogs, whose bites are the most common cause of human rabies. The feral dog population in India increased by at least 5 million, resulting in over 38 million additional dog bites and more than 47,000 extra deaths from rabies, costing $34 billion in economic impact.

Veterinary usage of diclofenac has been banned in India since 2006. Meloxicam, another NSAID, which is rapidly metabolized and harmless to vultures, has been suggested as an acceptable substitute for diclofenac. In addition, various conservation schemes are in place to help recover the vulture population. The population is recovering slowly and the decline has been significantly arrested in India, Pakistan and Nepal following a strict ban on the drugs causing harm to the vultures.

== History ==
Vultures in India live in communities and are generally very dependent on human activities. Hinduism, which represents about 79.8% of the country's population according to the 2011 Census, is particularly favorable to vultures. Cows are considered sacred by the majority of Hindus, so cow meat is generally not consumed by many Hindus due to religious beliefs. This results in cow carcasses being left to be fed on by vultures. Of the estimated 500 million cattle in India, only 4% were destined for consumption by humans as meat. Due to their Zoroastrian beliefs, India's Parsis relied mainly on vultures to eat corpses left in Towers of Silence. Vultures constituted the natural animal disposal system, processing carcasses, and nearly 15,000 vultures have been observed at the carcass depositories in the Indian capital of New Delhi.

== Decline ==
In the 1990s, a decrease in the number of vultures was noted by Vibhu Prakash of the Bombay Natural History Society, who had monitored vulture populations at Keoladeo National Park. Parsis in Mumbai started to notice in the early 1990s that there were fewer birds at the Towers of Silence in Mumbai. Villagers in northern India started to notice the declining vulture population in the mid-1990s. As the decline accelerated, the international scientific community attempted to investigate the cause of such decline. However, it was not easy to examine this issue because vultures could not legally be killed for scientific study in India, and freshly dead animals had become extremely rare, a situation exacerbated by the extremely hot weather in India, where temperatures before the monsoon routinely exceed 40 °C (104 °F). In 2002, National Geographic reported that scientists were "not sure" of the reason for the 95% population decline. Andrew Cunningham of the Zoological Society of London found that the usual suspects of pesticide poisoning, industrial pollutants or bacteria did not show anything abnormal in the vultures he could examine, and suspected a new type of toxin exposure.

== Causes ==
In 2003, after research on the possible viral causes of the decline, the culprit was discovered by Lindsay Oaks and his team at The Peregrine Fund to be diclofenac. Diclofenac is a common anti-inflammatory drug administered to livestock and is used to treat the symptoms of inflammation, fevers and/or pain associated with disease or wounds. It was widely used in India beginning in the 1990s. The drug is fatal to vultures, however, and a vulture is exposed to a mortal dose of diclofenac on eating from the carcass of an animal that had been treated with diclofenac recently. A simulation model demonstrated that if only 1% of carcasses were contaminated by diclofenac, Indian vulture populations would fall by between 60% and 90% annually, while a study of carcasses showed that about 10% were contaminated.

A genus of vultures called Gyps was the most affected by diclofenac. The population of the white-rumped vulture (Gyps bengalensis) fell 99.7% between 1993 and 2002. The populations of the Indian vulture (Gyps indicus) and the slender-billed vulture (Gyps tenuirostris) fell 97.4%. The percentages differ slightly because the white-rumped vulture is more sensitive to diclofenac than the other two species, but all three are in danger of extinction. Two other species of Gyps, the Himalayan vulture (Gyps himalayensis) and the Eurasian griffon (Gyps fulvus), have been less affected, the Eurasian griffon because it only winters in India and has a much smaller initial population, and the Himalayan vulture, with a similarly small population, because it is exclusively mountain-dwelling.

== Consequences ==
By removing all carrion, vultures had helped decrease pollution and the spread of diseases and had suppressed undesirable mammalian scavengers. The sudden collapse of the natural animal disposal system in India has had multiple consequences negatively impacting public health. A vulture's metabolism is a true "dead-end" for pathogens, but dogs and rats become carriers of the pathogens. Without vultures a large number of animal carcasses were left to rot, posing a serious risk to human health by providing a potential breeding ground for infectious germs and by enhancing the proliferation of pests such as rats.

The diseases carried by these mammals from rotting carcasses are indirectly responsible for thousands of human deaths. The carcasses formerly eaten by vultures rot in village fields, which also contaminates water sources. The loss of vultures has also resulted in a substantial increase in the population of feral dogs, whose bites are the most common cause of human rabies. The feral dog population in India increased by at least 5 million, resulting in over 38 million additional dog bites and more than 47,000 extra deaths from rabies, costing $34 billion in economic impact. On average, it was estimated that human mortality rates increased by more than 4% during the period of 2000 to 2005, when the vulture population reached its lowest levels.

The people of the Parsi community in India leave their dead exposed in high towers called Towers of Silence in order for the vultures to feed. Due to the decline in vulture population, they have been forced to drop these ancient customs for reasons of hygiene, since now bodies take six months to disappear.

== Reaction ==
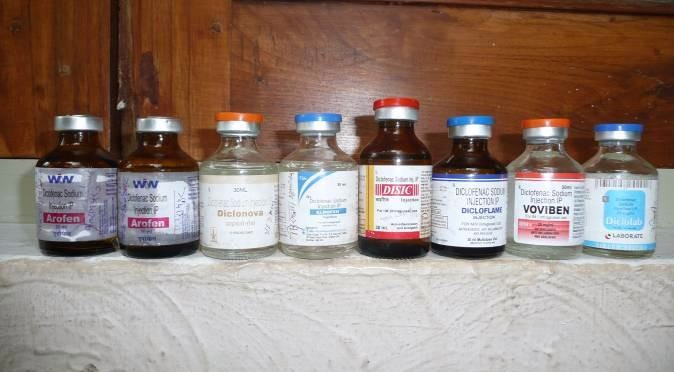
Diclofenac available in 2009

=== Diclofenac regulation ===
Following the findings on diclofenac, the drug was banned for veterinary use in India on 11 March 2006; Nepal followed suit in August and Pakistan in October. Bangladesh banned it in 2010. A replacement drug was quickly developed and proposed after tests on vultures in captivity: meloxicam. Meloxicam, an NSAID that is rapidly metabolized and harmless to vultures, was suggested as an acceptable substitute for diclofenac. Pharmaceutical companies were encouraged to increase their production of meloxicam in an effort to bring the cost closer to that of diclofenac. In 2015, the government of India ordered the vial size of the human drug to be reduced to 3ml to avoid misusing them for veterinary use.

Some other drugs developed as alternatives to diclofenac—aceclofenac, ketoprofen and nimesulide—have also been shown to be toxic to vultures. Diclofenac for human use was still being diverted into veterinary uses through illegal sale of multidose vials intended for humans for use in cattle in 2011. The ban was strengthened by the ban of vials larger than a single human dose (3 ml) in 2015, but vials are still manufactured illegally. While the ban on diclofenac has been successful in Nepal and Bangladesh, it is still widely available in India. A study published in 2020 showed that meloxicam was the most common veterinary NSAID in Nepal in 2017 (89.9%). Although diclofenac was almost entirely absent from pharmacies in Bangladesh, there was a higher proportion of sales of ketoprofen compared to meloxicam in 2018, despite the partial ban on ketoprofen by the Bangladeshi government in 2016. In 2021, tolfenamic acid was identified as another alternative that is safe for vultures.

Despite the regulation of Indian access to diclofenac, vultures have continued to die of diclofenac poisoning. In a study of corpses collected between 2011 and 2014, 14 out of 29 white-backed vultures and 9 out of 12 Himalayan griffons had high enough levels of diclofenac in their kidney tissue that it is likely diclofenac poisoning was their cause of death. Nevertheless, there are indications that the diclofenac ban has decreased the speed of decline.

Despite the vulture crisis, diclofenac remains available in other countries including many in Europe. It was controversially approved for veterinary use in Spain in 2013 and continues to be available, despite Spain being home to around 90% of the European vulture population and an independent simulation showing that the drug could reduce the population of vultures by 1–8% annually. Spain's medicine agency presented simulations suggesting that the number of deaths would be quite small. New sanitary regulation laws regarding animal carcass disposal in Spain also reduce the amount of available food for vultures while adding to costs and greenhouse gas emissions.

=== Conservation ===
Captive-breeding programmes for the Indian vulture have been created to help recover its numbers. As the vultures are long lived, slow breeding and notoriously difficult to breed in captivity, the programmes are expected to take a long time. The captive-bred birds will be released to the wild when the environment is clear of diclofenac.

In 2002, the Parsis asked the International Centre for Birds of Prey for assistance with vulture breeding.

In 2014, Saving Asia's Vultures from Extinction announced that they would start releasing captive-bred birds into the wild by 2016. 2 Himalayan Griffons were released in Haryana, India in 2016. In 2017, Saving Asia's Vulture's from Exctinction released captive-reared white-rumped vultures in Nepal.

In 2016, Jatayu Conservation Breeding Centre in Pinjore released captive bred vultures into the wild as part of Asia's first vulture re-introduction program. Small numbers of birds have bred across peninsular India, in Karnataka and Tamil Nadu. Three more breeding centers have been set up in the Indian states of West Bengal, Assam and Madhya Pradesh in addition to four smaller facilities in collaboration with zoos.

In 2020, the Ministry of Environment, Forest and Climate Change of Government of India launched a Vulture Action Plan 2020–25. It aims to step up conservation measures and set up a mechanism to ensure that toxic drugs other than diclofenac are also banned for veterinary use.

== See also ==
- African cheetah translocation to India
- African vulture crisis
- Eliminate Sparrows campaign
- Wildlife of India
- List of national parks of India
- Critically Endangered
