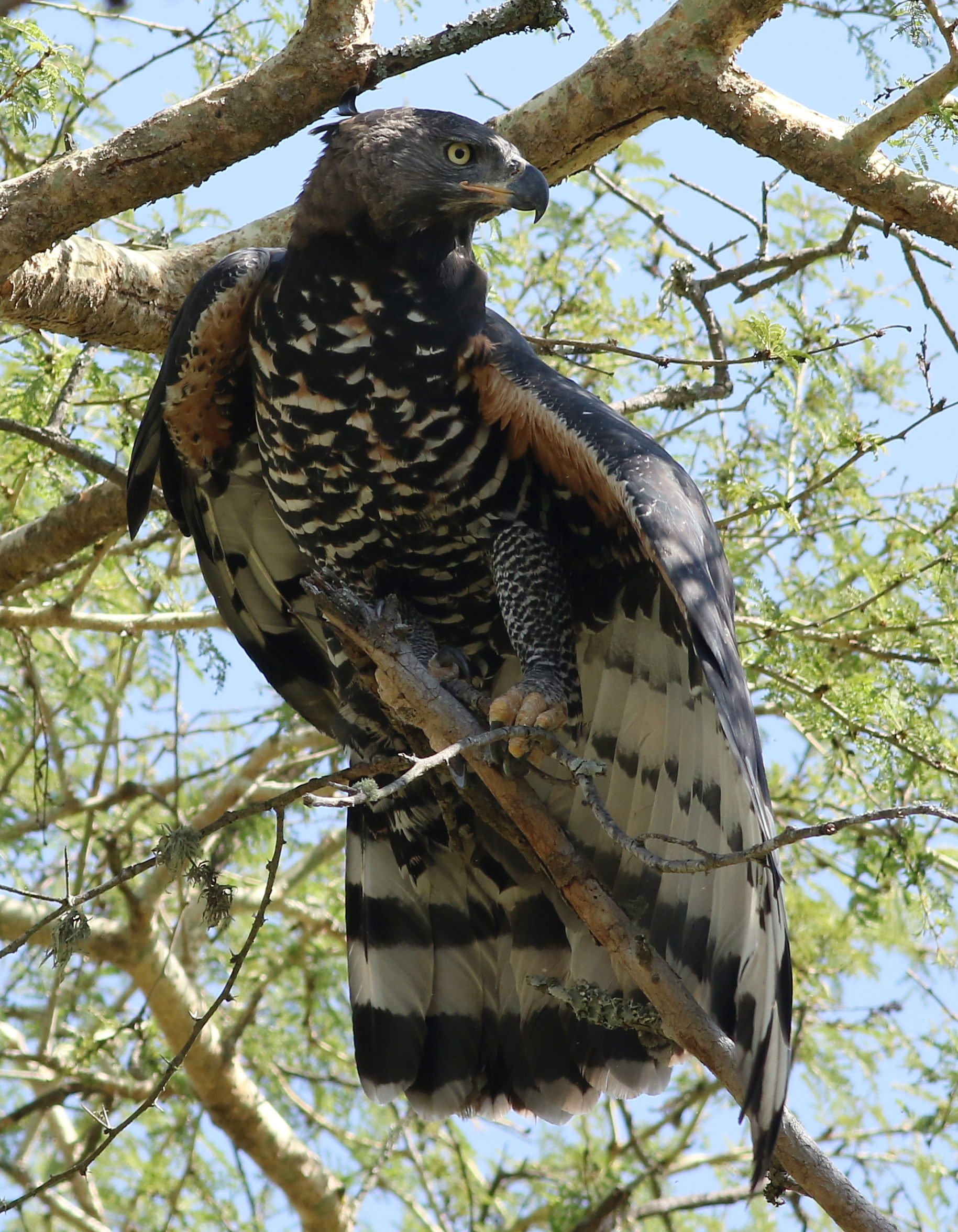
- Crowned eagle (Stephanoaetus coronatus) in South Africa.

Scientific classification
- Kingdom: Animalia
- Phylum: Chordata
- Class: Aves
- Order: Accipitriformes
- Family: Accipitridae
- Subfamily: Aquilinae

Genera
- About 10, see article

= Aquilinae =

Subfamily of birds

The Aquilinae are a subfamily of eagles of the family Accipitridae. The general common name used for members of this subfamily is "booted eagle", although this is also the common name of a member of the subfamily, or "true eagle", though this term can more narrowly be applied to the genus Aquila. At one point, this subfamily was considered inclusive with the Buteoninae (commonly known as buzzards or buteonine hawks) based probably on some shared morphological characteristics. However, research on the DNA of the booted eagles has shown that they are a monophyletic group that probably have had millions of years of separation from other extant forms of accipitrid.

== Description ==
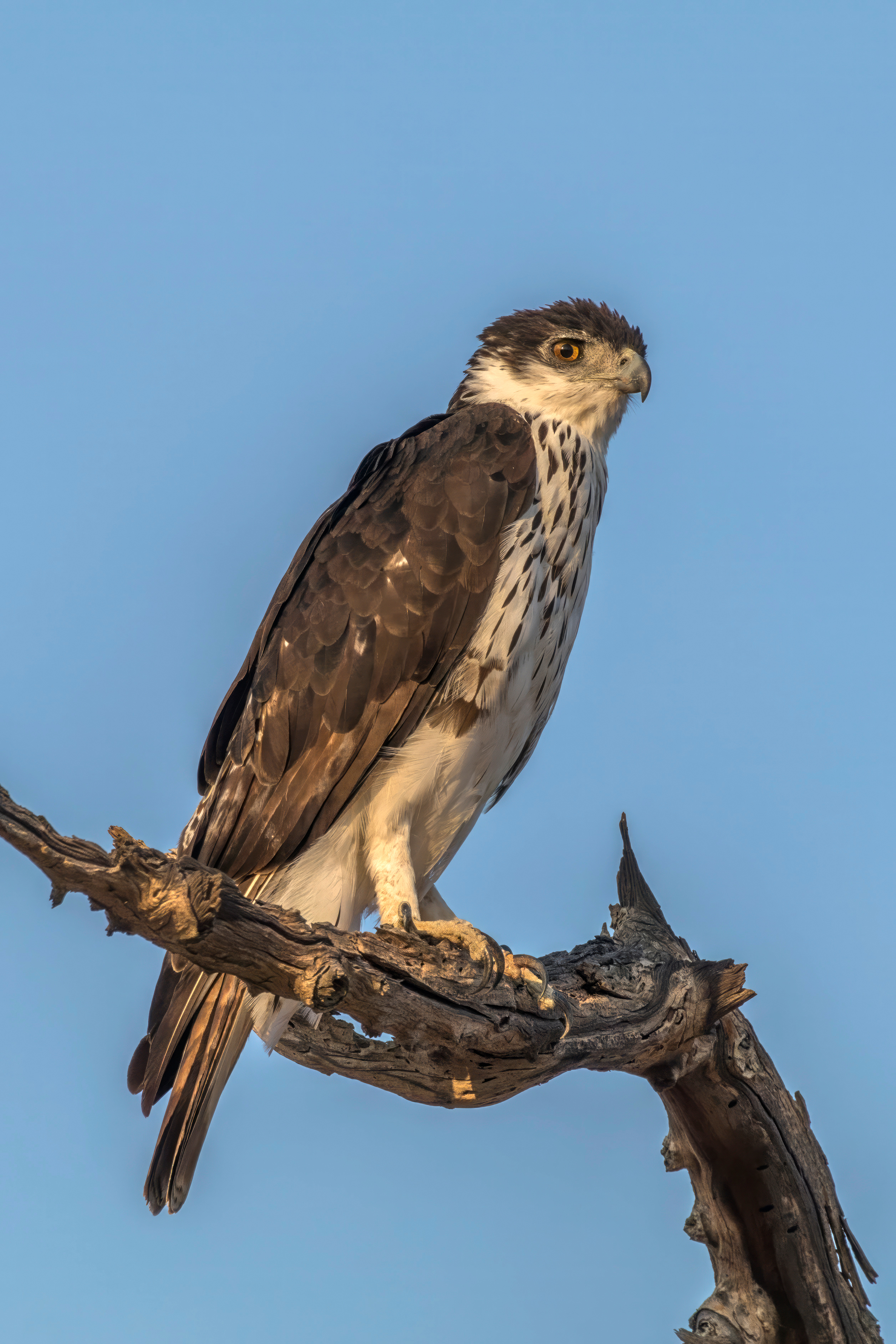
The formidable bearing and talons are evident on even modestly sized booted eagles such as African hawk eagles.

The Aquilinae consists of medium-sized to very large species. Modern species range in mass from the recently recognized pygmy eagle (Hieraaetus weiskei) of Papua New Guinea, which weighs about 500 g (1.1 lb), to the martial eagle (Polemaetus bellicosus) and golden eagle (Aquila chrysaetos), which both weigh about 4.2 kg (9.3 lb) on average. In wingspan, extant Aquilinae range from the pygmy eagle, with a median of 1.18 m (3 ft 10 in), to the wedge-tailed eagle (Aquila audax) and martial eagles, which average about 2.15 m (7 ft 1 in) and 2.12 m (6 ft 11 in) in wingspan, respectively. Total length can vary from 38 to 106 cm (15 to 42 in), in the pygmy and wedge-tailed eagles, respectively. The record sizes for wild booted eagles are 7.7 kg (17 lb) for a golden eagle in body mass and 2.84 m (9 ft 4 in) for a wedge-tailed eagle in wingspan. Dwarfing these species, the booted eagle species Haast's eagle (Hieraaetus moorei) of New Zealand, was probably the most massive species ever known in the entire accipitrid family, with females averaging an estimated 10 to 14 kg (22 to 31 lb) and perhaps weighing up to 17 kg (37 lb) and measuring up to about 140 cm (55 in) long, while males weighed an estimated 9 to 12 kg (20 to 26 lb). The Haast's eagle went extinct by the 16th century when human colonizers killed off their primary prey, the moas. Beyond their typically large size, Aquilinae species have few outward shared characteristics as they are a fairly diverse subfamily. Nonetheless, every species shares the feature of their legs being covered in feathers. Only two buteonine hawks share this feature beyond the Aquilinae, in a presumed case of convergent evolution. Many species within the subfamily are colored for camouflage with varying patterns of brown, black, yellowish or white being commonplace, darker colors being favored by forest dwelling varieties and brown to straw coloring common to open country species. A few more brightly colored species (in adult plumage), with striking patterns of chestnut in about four, none more striking than the ornate hawk-eagle (Spizaetus ornatus). Roughly half of booted eagle species have a strikingly different looking juvenile plumage, which can in some species be nearly all white, but even where the differences are subtle between adults and immatures, usually some physical differences are noticeable such as white wing patches in traditional Aquila species, to visually distinguish young from adults. Many species have a notable head-crest, such as Nisaetus and most Spizaetus, with the feature being most extreme in the long-crested eagle (Lophaetus occipitalis). Like most accipitrids, they have large powerful hooked beaks for tearing flesh from their prey, strong legs and powerful talons. Compared to other large raptors, the feet and talons of booted eagle species are often particularly large and powerful relative to their size. The most extreme example seems to be the crowned eagle, which has a hallux-claw (or rear talon) of around 56 mm (2.2 in) about the same sized hallux-claw as the Philippine eagle (Pithecophaga jefferyi) (not part of the Aquilinae), which weighs on average nearly twice as much. The booted eagles also have extremely keen eyesight to enable them to spot potential prey from a distance.

== Life histories and range ==
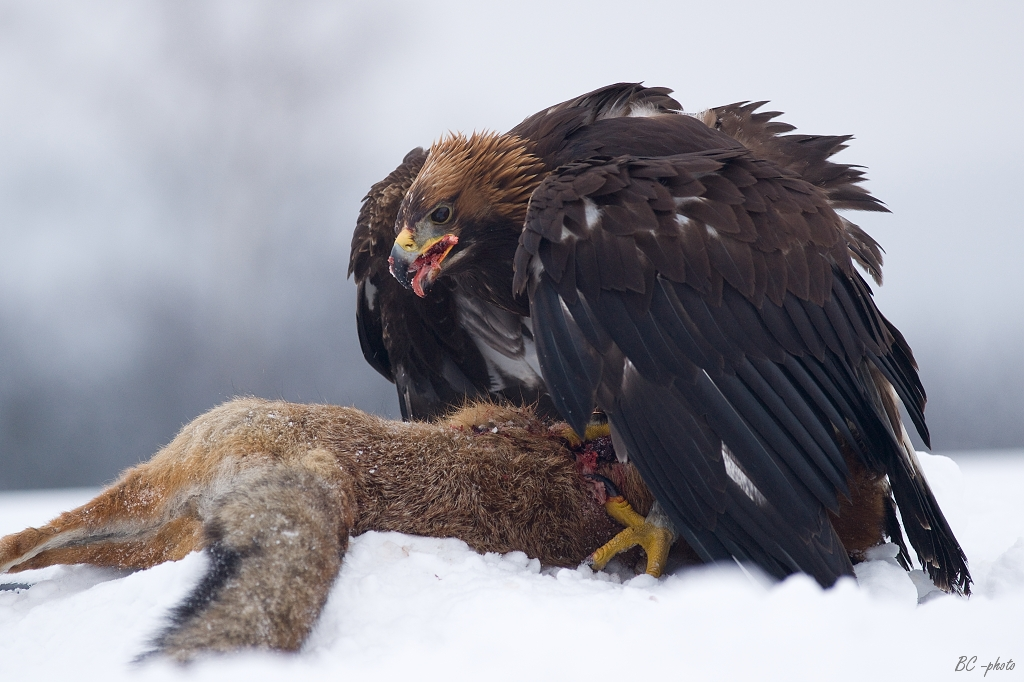
Golden eagles, like all members of this subfamily, are capable predators of large prey such as foxes but do not disdain carrion either.

Booted eagles are varying in their habitats and habits, being found on every continent inhabited by accipitrids, which includes all continents with the exception of Antarctica. They may inhabit nearly all of the world's terrestrial habitats, with the majority of species being largely forest dwelling, but several preferring all kinds of open habitat from steppe to prairie to tundra as well as most rocky or mountainous areas. By far the widest ranging species of booted eagle is the golden eagle, which is distributed in most of North America (where it is the only species of the subfamily north of Mexico) and much of Eurasia including a majority of Europe, often along most mountainous terrains therein but also other land-based habitats with typically remote semi-open or hilly hunting grounds accessible. So-called "hawk-eagles" are forest dwelling booted eagle types largely represented by Spizaetus (in the neotropics) and Nisaetus (in Asia). Despite many similar features in the two main hawk-eagle genera, they apparently evolved separately for some time and are not closely related. The peak diversity for Aquilinae are in Africa, where nearly half of extant species are known to dwell at least seasonally, exploiting a diversity of different hunting styles, habitats, nesting habits and general body forms. All booted eagle species are opportunistic predators which prey mostly on small vertebrates, often subsisting on a wide range of mammals, birds, reptiles and amphibians as they become locally available or abundant (carrion is also rarely ignored). Species favoring more open habitats tend to hunt most often on the wing, using distance or hugging contours of the ground to surprise prey. Forest dwelling species are more likely to be perch-hunters, watching for prey activity from a high tree perch, but every kind of booted eagle can vary their hunting techniques when necessary. In cases where they become specialists, booted eagles tend to be mammal hunters, such as the considerable dependence of Spanish imperial eagle (Aquila adalberti) on rabbits, of breeding steppe eagle (Aquila nipalensis) on sousliks or Verreaux's eagle (Aquila verreauxii) on hyraxes. Exceptions include the Ayres's hawk-eagle (Hieraaetus ayresii) and, to a lesser extent, the rufous-bellied eagle (Lophotriorchis kienerii), both of which are smallish, swift-flying bird-hunting specialists who dive (falcon-like) on woodland birds while the black eagle (Ictinaetus malaiensis) feeds largely on the contents of birds' nests and squirrel dreys (the only hawk or owl specialized to do so). Most booted eagle species have relatively large feet and talons and can semi-regularly go after prey as large or larger than themselves, even smaller species can occasionally dispatch prey of up to two to three times their own weight. Rare attacks on large prey, such as ungulates, adult monkeys or medium-sized carnivores or other much larger animals, usually involve the larger species of booted eagle, whereas such attacks are exceptionally rare to non-existent in eagles of other lineages. At least four large booted eagles have been known to dispatch prey weighing 30 kg (66 lb) or more.

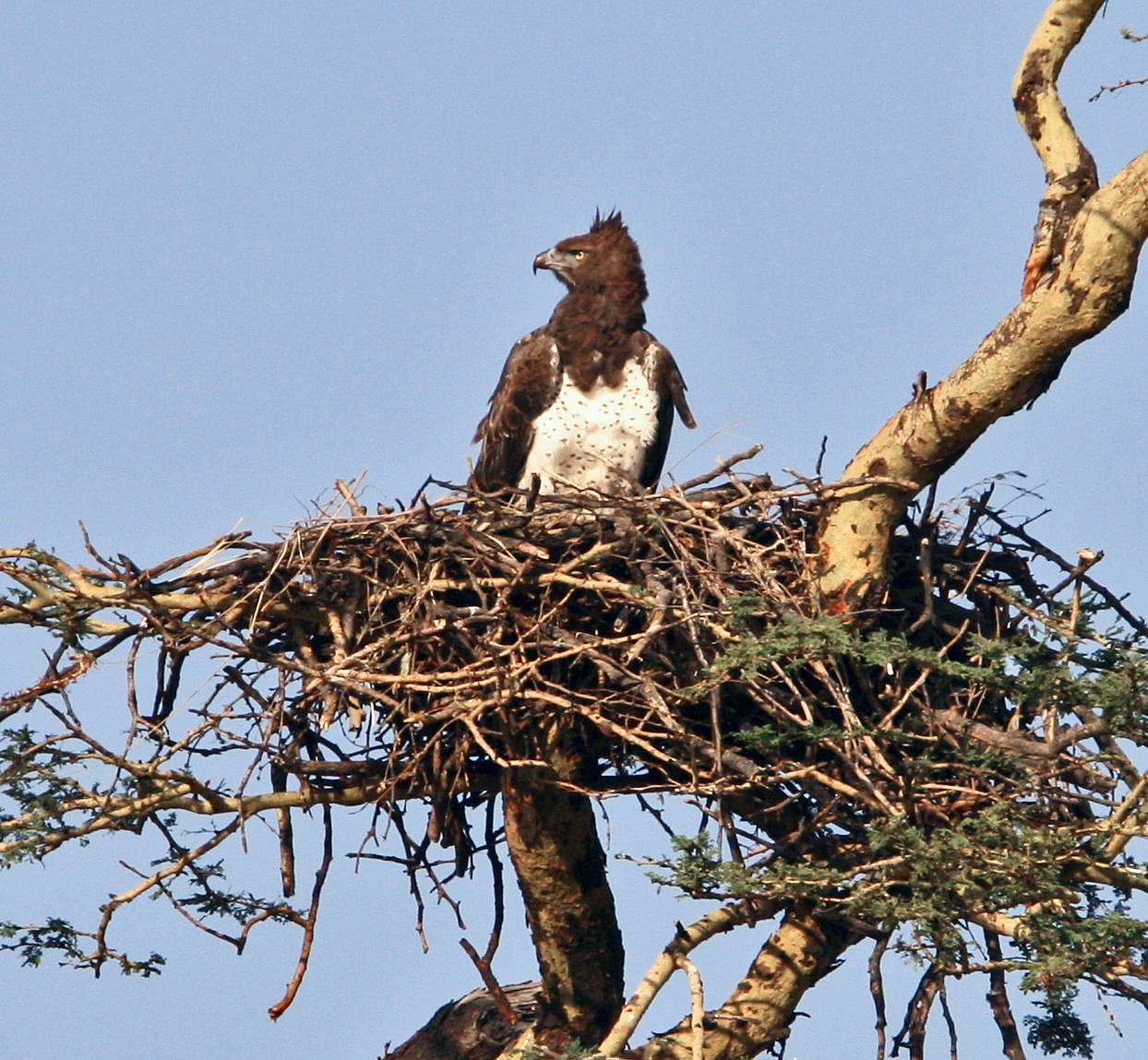
A Martial eagle on its nest in Tanzania.

Booted eagles, like almost all raptorial birds, are strongly territorial and tend to maintain expansive home ranges against conspecifics. Given their need for ample hunting ranges, the territory of most booted eagles tend to be extremely large, with several dozen square kilometers being common. Territories are usually maintained with display flights but vocal displays are known in some of the denser forest dwelling varieties. Nests of Aquilinae tend to be typically large as in most eagles, with ample surface space needed, whether located in trees, rocky formations or on the ground. As is typical in many raptorial birds, pair bonds are strong between males and females and in many booted eagle species, they may mate for life. Primarily females incubate the egg and brood the young, while males usually have the responsibility of food capture. Clutch sizes are usually small in booted eagles, rarely more than 3 eggs are laid, and most parents will manage to produce only one to two fledglings depending on species. In most booted eagles, beyond threats from the outside world, most eggs are laid and hatched at intervals, thus one sibling is usually considerably bigger and often kills its younger siblings. While brood size and fledgling rates are typically low, booted eagles may have even lower productivity due to the long dependence period of the young relying on their parents for food and protection, and some species may only nest every other year.

== General status ==
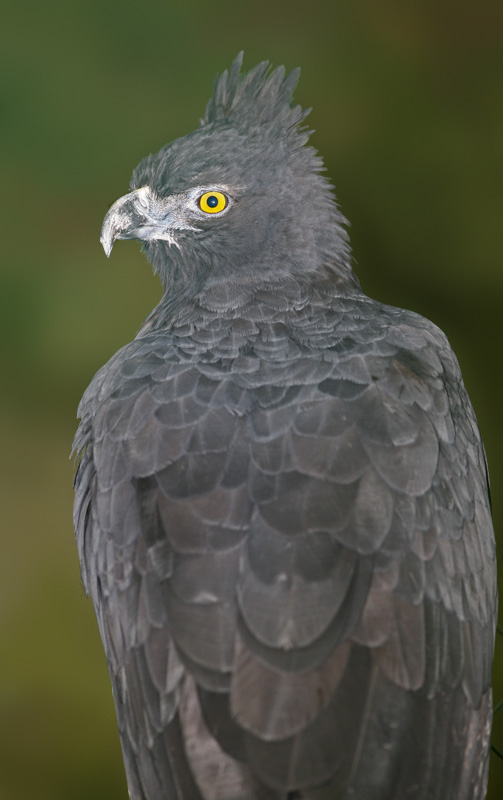
The black-and-chestnut eagle is one of several endangered booted eagles.

Due to their large territories and low productivity, most booted eagle species are sparsely distributed and not infrequently uncommon-to-rare even in regional strongholds where ample habitat remains. Booted eagle species tend to be highly sensitive to human activities, mainly habitat alteration or destruction, human disturbance, collision with man made objects (especially non-insulated electrical pylons and wind turbines), accidental or intentional killing of staple prey species and various forms of persecution by humans. Due mainly to these factors, seven species of booted eagle are currently classified as Vulnerable to extinction by the IUCN. Four little-known forest dwelling species are classified in more severe status as Endangered: the Philippine hawk-eagle (Nisaetus philippensis), Pinsker's hawk-eagle (Nisaetus pinskeri), Javan hawk-eagle (Nisaetus bartelsi) and the black-and-chestnut eagle (Spizaetus isidori). A very different eagle, the steppe eagle, is also considered Endangered despite having been considered one of the most numerous of all eagles after a disastrous, ongoing decline mostly due to electrocutions from dangerous powerlines, poisonings and increasing steppe fires around nests, these killing them off en masse while breeding and migrating. An even more drastic classification of Critically Endangered was given to the Flores hawk-eagle (N. floris). In all five endangered hawk-eagles, near epidemic levels of forest habitat degradation, primarily direct deforestation, has been determined as the primary cause of their declines.

== Systematics ==
The cladogram of the Aquilinae shown below is based on a molecular phylogenetic study of the Accipitridae by Therese Catanach and collaborators that was published in 2024.

- Aquilinae
  - - Stephanoaetus – crowned eagle (placement uncertain)
    - Nisaetus – hawk-eagles (10 species)
  - - Spizaetus – hawk-eagle (4 species)
    - - Lophotriorchis – rufous-bellied eagle
      - - Polemaetus – martial eagle
        - - - Lophaetus – long-crested eagle
            - - Ictinaetus – black eagle
              - Clanga – spotted eagles (3 species)
          - - Hieraaetus – eagles (5 species)
            - Aquila – eagles (11 species)

Image	Genus	Living species
	Stephanoaetus Sclater, 1922	S. coronatus- Crowned eagle
	Nisaetus Hodgson, 1836	N. kelaarti- Legge's hawk-eagle; N. nanus- Wallace's hawk-eagle; N. nipalensis- Mountain hawk-eagle; N. alboniger- Blyth's hawk-eagle; N. bartelsi- Javan hawk-eagle; N. lanceolatus- Sulawesi hawk-eagle; N. pinskeri- Pinsker's hawk-eagle; N. philippensis- Philippine hawk-eagle; N. cirrhatus- Changeable hawk-eagle; N. floris- Flores hawk-eagle
	Spizaetus Vieillot, 1816	S. tyrannus- Black hawk-eagle; S. melanoleucus- Black-and-white hawk-eagle; S. ornatus- Ornate hawk-eagle; S. isidori- Black-and-chestnut eagle
	Lophotriorchis Sharpe, 1874	L. kienerii- Rufous-bellied eagle
	Polemaetus Heine, 1890	P. bellicosus- Martial eagle
	Lophaetus Kaup, 1847	L. occipitalis- Long-crested eagle
	Ictinaetus Blyth, 1843	I. malaiensis- Black eagle
	Clanga Adamowicz, 1858	C. hastata- Indian spotted eagle; C. pomarina- Lesser spotted eagle; C. clanga- Greater spotted eagle
	Hieraaetus Kaup, 1844	H. wahlbergi- Wahlberg's eagle; H. ayresii- Ayres's hawk-eagle; H. pennatus- Booted eagle; H. weiskei- Pygmy eagle; H. morphnoides- Little eagle
	Aquila Brisson, 1760	A. nipalensis- Steppe eagle; A. rapax- Tawny eagle; A. adalberti- Spanish imperial eagle; A. heliaca- Eastern imperial eagle; A. chrysaetos- Golden eagle; A. africana- Cassin's hawk-eagle; A. audax- Wedge-tailed eagle; A. gurneyi- Gurney's eagle; A. verreauxii- Verreaux's eagle; A. fasciata- Bonelli's eagle; A. spilogaster- African hawk-eagle
