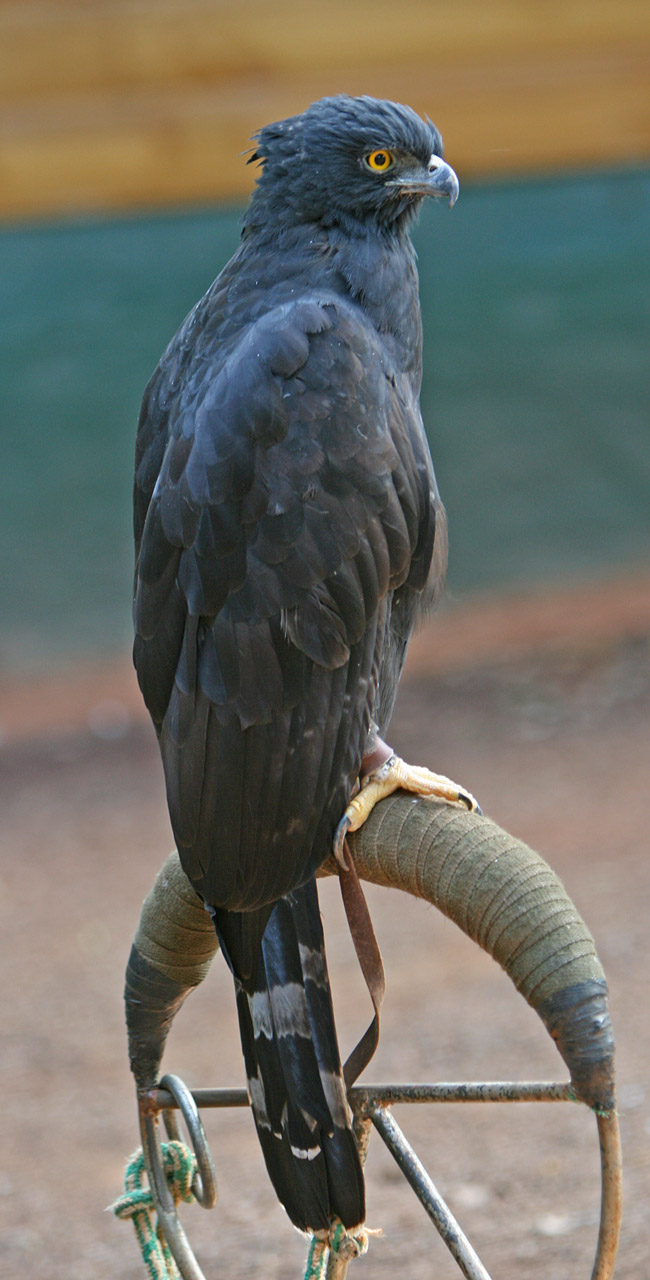
- Black hawk-eagle (Spizaetus tyrannus)

Scientific classification
- Kingdom: Animalia
- Phylum: Chordata
- Class: Aves
- Order: Accipitriformes
- Family: Accipitridae
- Subfamily: Aquilinae
- Genus: Spizaetus; Vieillot, 1816

Type species
- Falco ornatus Daudin, 1800

Species
- Spizaetus isidori; Spizaetus melanoleucus; Spizaetus ornatus; Spizaetus tyrannus; and see text

Synonyms
- Spizastur Lesson, 1839; Oroaetus Des Murs, 1845

= Spizaetus =

Genus of birds

Spizaetus is the typical hawk-eagle birds of prey genus found in the tropics of the Americas. It was however used to indicate a group of tropical eagles that included species occurring in southern and southeastern Asia and one representative of this genus in the rainforests of West Africa. The Old World species have been separated into the genus Nisaetus. Several species have a prominent head crest. These are medium to large-sized raptors, most being between 55 and 75 cm (21.5 and 29.5 in) long, and tend to be long-tailed and slender.

The American Ornithologists' Union merges Spizastur into Spizaetus since 2007.

The name Spizaetus comes from the ancient Greek words spizias 'hawk' and aetos 'eagle'.

Spizaetus eagles are forest birds with several species having a preference for highland woodlands. They build stick nests in trees. The sexes are similarly plumaged with typical raptor brown upperparts and pale underparts, but young birds are distinguishable from adults, often by a whiter head.

These eagles eat medium-sized vertebrate prey such as mammals, birds and reptiles.

== Species ==
The species that were historically placed in this genus are:

Old World species now moved to Nisaetus

- Flores hawk-eagle Nisaetus floris (earlier Spizaetus cirrhatus floris or Spizaetus floris)
- Mountain hawk-eagle, Nisaetus nipalensis (earlier Spizaetus nipalensis)
  - The Western Ghats and Sri Lankan race has been suggested as a full species Nisaetus kelaarti.
- Blyth's hawk-eagle, Nisaetus alboniger (earlier Spizaetus alboniger)
- Changeable hawk-eagle, Nisaetus cirrhatus (earlier Spizaetus cirrhatus)
- Javan hawk-eagle, Nisaetus bartelsi (earlier Spizaetus bartelsi)
- Sulawesi hawk-eagle, Nisaetus lanceolatus (earlier Spizaetus lanceolatus)
- (Northern) Philippine hawk-eagle, Nisaetus philippensis (earlier Spizaetus philippensis)
- Southern Philippine hawk-eagle, Nisaetus pinskeri (earlier Spizaetus (philippensis) pinskeri)
- Wallace's hawk-eagle, Nisaetus nanus (earlier Spizaetus nanus)

Moved to Aquila

- Cassin's hawk-eagle, Aquila africana (earlier Spizaetus africanus)

New World species retained in Spizaetus

Genus Spizaetus – Vieillot, 1816 – four species
Common name	Scientific name and subspecies	Range	Size and ecology	IUCN status and estimated population
Black hawk-eagle or tyrant hawk-eagle	Spizaetus tyrannus (Wied, 1820) Two subspecies: S. t. serus - Friedmann, 1950; S. t. tyrannus - (Wied-Neuwied, 1820)	central Mexico to eastern Peru, the south of Brazil, and far northern Argentina	Size: Habitat: Diet:	LC
Black-and-white hawk-eagle, traditionally Spizastur	Spizaetus melanoleucus (Vieillot, 1816)	Oaxaca to Veracruz in southern Mexico southwards throughout Central America	Size: Habitat: Diet:	LC
Ornate hawk-eagle	Spizaetus ornatus (Daudin, 1800) Two subspecies: S. o. vicarius – Friedmann, 1935; S. o. ornatus – (Daudin, 1800)	southern Mexico and the Yucatán Peninsula, to Trinidad and Tobago, south to Peru and Argentina	Size: Habitat: Diet:	NT
Black-and-chestnut eagle	Spizaetus isidori (Des Murs, 1845)	Northern Andes (including Venezuelan coastal range and Sierra Nevada de Santa Marta)	Size: Habitat: Diet:	EN
