= Javan hawk-eagle =

Conservation status
- Endangered (IUCN 3.1)

Scientific classification
- Kingdom: Animalia
- Phylum: Chordata
- Class: Aves
- Order: Accipitriformes
- Family: Accipitridae
- Genus: Nisaetus
- Species: N. bartelsi

Binomial name
- Nisaetus bartelsi Stresemann, 1924

Synonyms
- Spizaetus bartelsi

Species of bird

The Javan hawk-eagle (Nisaetus bartelsi) is a medium-sized raptor, endemic to the island of Java, in Indonesia.

== Description ==
Adult females weigh approximately 1.7 kg and are larger and more robust than males. They measure approximately 60 cm in length, with a wingspan of 110 to 130 cm. The species possesses short, rounded wings with a low aspect ratio, providing high maneuverability when flying through dense forest canopies.

Adults feature dark brown upperparts, a chestnut or rufous head and nape, and a tall black crest tipped with white that is held vertically when perched. The throat is white with a prominent, dark longitudinal stripe running down the center. The underparts are white with heavy streaking and barring, while the flight feathers and the tail both display bold dark banding. Adult females can be distinguished from males by a darker, blackish crown extending into the crest and a clearer mesial stripe on the neck.

Juveniles differ considerably in appearance, having paler whitish or tan underparts, a shorter or less developed crest, and lighter, less distinct banding on the wings and tail. Age classes can also be identified by eye color progression: irises are very dark brown in downy chicks, transition to dark blue, bluish-grey, or greenish-grey in juveniles, turn light grey to lemon yellow in subadults, and reach bright golden yellow in full adults.

The Javan hawk-eagle is a vocal species, giving harsh, high-pitched cries, usually heard from within the canopy.

== Taxonomy and systematics ==
The Javan hawk-eagle belongs to the raptor family Accipitridae within the order Accipitriformes. Within the subfamily Aquilinae, the genus Nisaetus consists of forest-dwelling birds of prey inhabiting tropical rainforests across South and Southeast Asia. It is closely related to other regional hawk-eagles, including the changeable hawk-eagle (Nisaetus cirrhatus), Blyth's hawk-eagle (Nisaetus alboniger), and the Sulawesi hawk-eagle (Nisaetus lanceolatus).

In 1908, the German ornithologist Otto Finsch first recognized the Javan hawk-eagle as a distinct crested form, separating it from the changeable hawk-eagle (N. cirrhatus limnaetus), which shares Java but lacks a prominent crest. In 1924, Erwin Stresemann formally proposed the scientific name Spizaetus bartelsi. In 1953, Dean Amadon confirmed its status as a distinct species.

Molecular phylogenetic studies published in 2005 and 2007 showed that the genus Spizaetus was paraphyletic, meaning it did not form a natural group. The physical similarities between Asian and Neotropical hawk-eagles resulted from convergent evolution rather than recent common ancestry. Because the Asian species form a distinct clade, they were transferred to the resurrected genus Nisaetus, giving the species its current name, Nisaetus bartelsi.

== Distribution and habitat ==
=== Geographic range ===
Java, Indonesia, Asia.

The Javan hawk-eagle is strictly endemic to the island of Java, in Indonesia. Its geographic range extends across Java, from lowland forests in the west (such as Ujung Kulon National Park and Mount Halimun-Salak), through the central volcanic mountain chain (including Mount Slamet and the Dieng Mountains) to the easternmost reserves (such as Meru Betiri National Park, Mount Bromo-Tengger-Semeru, and Alas Purwo National Park).

Historically, its range was assumed to be split into two isolated populations by a broad non-forested gap in Central Java. Later, field surveys confirmed that forest patches in Central Java sustain approximately 15% of the total wild population, which linked eastern and western populations.

=== Habitat preferences and elevation ===
Nisaetus bartelsi is a tropical forest specialist. It relies heavily on primary and mature secondary evergreen rainforests, including lowland, hill, and tropical montane rainforests. It prefers zones with a wet climate that experience a short dry season with at least 30 rainy days during the four driest consecutive months. The species tends to fly at altitudes that range from sea level (0 m) up to 2,500–3,000 m above sea level on major volcanic peaks. Javan hawk-eagles are ecologically characterized as slope specialists, as they strongly prefer rugged, undulating, or mountainous areas over flat plains.

Adults that hold a territory mostly stay in continuous, undisturbed natural forest. In contrast, young birds that are dispersing (moving away from where they hatched) are more flexible. They also use regrown forest, Sumatran pine (Pinus merkusii) plantations, kapok (Ceiba pentandra) stands, tea and coffee estates, and agricultural edges.

== Behavior and ecology ==
=== Daily activity and flight behavior ===
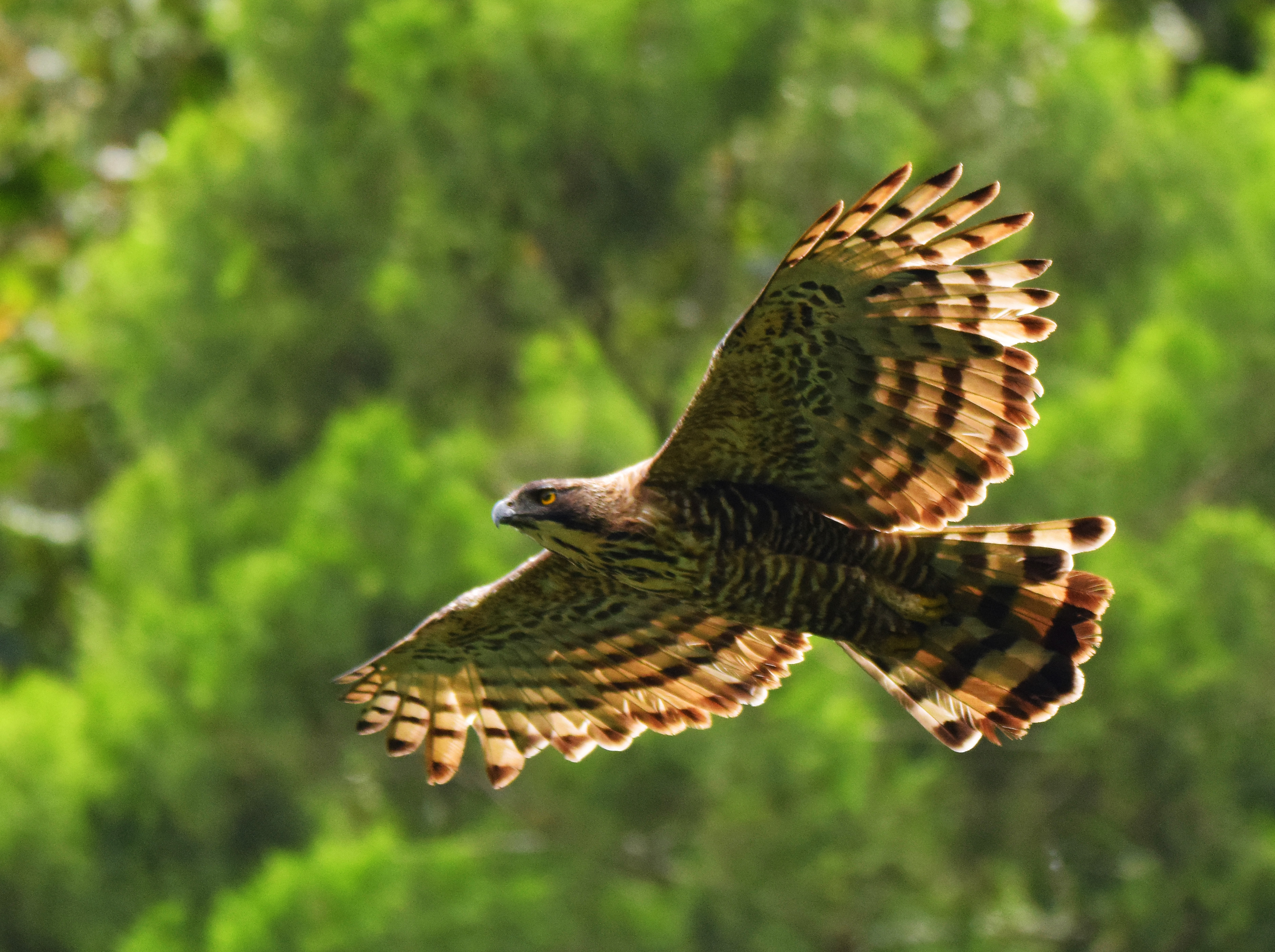
Javan hawk-eagle soaring.

The Javan hawk-eagle’s daily activity is strongly regulated by weather conditions. Birds soar during mild, warm weather with moderate winds, but during cloudy, foggy, or rainy weather, they remain inactive inside the forest canopy. The species primarily occupies upper forest layers, specifically where canopy height is 20–30 m or more than 30m. It spends roughly 95% of daylight hours perched on emergent, bare, or dead trees on ridges and slopes to survey its surroundings. Flying is relatively infrequent compared to perching. Birds usually forage and hunt between 07:00 and 16:30, with peak activity concentrated from 07:00 to 11:00.

=== Mating system and breeding cycle ===
The Javan hawk-eagle is monogamous. Sexual maturity is reached at 3 to 4 years of age, with breeding usually commencing in its fifth year. Once pairs are established, they breed once every two years under normal conditions. Egg laying occurs between December and June (middle to late rainy season) with a major laying peak in January. Copulation takes place on or near the nest tree during nest building and incubation, lasting 5–10 seconds per session and occurring up to several times daily. If an egg or nestling is lost early, the pair can lay a replacement egg within three months.

=== Nesting ecology ===
Female Javan hawk-eagle feeds her chick (paler) in their nest.

Both partners participate in nest building. The male carries sticks and branches while the female arranges them. Nests of Nisaetus bartelsi are open bowl structures measuring 70–150 cm in diameter and 20–56 cm in depth, built from twigs and lined with green leaves. Nests are generally built on steep mountain slopes, frequently situated in valleys or adjacent to stream and river corridors. They are constructed high in the main fork of a large, broad-crowned tree, often resting on top of ferns that grow on the branch, such as bird’s-nest fern (Asplenium nidus) or staghorn fern (Platycerium bifurcatum). Preferred nest trees include rasamala (Altingia excelsa), kapok (Ceiba pentandra), wild fig (Ficus spp.), and oaks (Castanopsis and Quercus spp.). Breeding pairs frequently reuse the same nest trees in consecutive years unless disturbed.

=== Clutch, incubation, and parental care ===
The clutch is a single egg, measuring 60.0–69.9 mm by 42.0–53.8 mm, with an eggshell weight of ~6.15 g. Incubation lasts 47 to 48 days and is performed primarily by the female. The male protects the nest and occasionally takes short turns on the egg. Chicks fledge at 60 to 70 days old. Then, the young birds remain dependent on their parents near the territory until the next breeding season. Older immatures sometimes assist their parents by repairing nests or guarding the young of later breeding seasons.

=== Hunting techniques ===
Javan hawk-eagle perched on a brand, scanning its surroundings.

The Javan hawk-eagle is primarily a specialized “still-hunter.” It perches quietly in the hidden canopy, usually with its crest erect, scanning for movement before making a sudden dive or swoop to seize prey with its talons. If no prey appears after a period of waiting, it flies 10-20 m to an adjacent branch and then resumes its scanning. It rarely hunts while flying, but it occasionally soars low over the canopy or open margins to flush prey and pounce on it.

=== Diet composition ===
The species is an opportunistic carnivore. It feeds on a wide range of forest-dwelling mammals, birds, and reptiles. Mammals make up the largest share of the diet. Key prey includes tree squirrels (Sciuridae), common treeshrews (Tupaia glis), rats and other small rodents (Muridae), fruit bats (Chiroptera), lesser mouse deer (Tragulus javanicus), Javan stink badger (Mydaus javensis), and Sunda flying lemurs (Cynocephalus variegatus). Large individuals occasionally prey on young arboreal primates, including juvenile ebony langurs (Trachypithecus auratus) and crab-eating macaques (Macaca fascicularis). Birds are taken less often than mammals. Recorded species include the chestnut-bellied Partridge (Arborophila javanica), barred button-quail (Turnix suscitator), emerald dove (Chalcophaps indica), Javan frogmouth (Batrachostomus javensis), Javan kingfisher (Halcyon cyanoventris), woodpeckers (Picus sp.), bulbuls (Pycnonotus sp.), and domestic poultry. Reptiles are the rarest prey group, and include arboreal snakes, agamid lizards (Bronchocela jubata), and skinks (Scincidae).

=== Habitat loss and fragmentation ===
Centuries of deforestation have reduced Java's natural forest cover to less than 10% of its original extent. Lowland rainforests have been severely degraded to 2.0–2.3% of their original area. As a result, the wild population, estimated at 600 to 1,000 individuals (137 to 188 breeding pairs), is split into small subpopulations on disconnected mountain blocks.

=== Illegal wildlife trade and national symbol impact ===
Chicks and fledglings are taken directly from nests or trapped during juvenile dispersal to supply the illegal pet market. The 1993 “National Rare Animal” declaration paradoxically increased the bird’s market value and illegal demand, and many poached eagles die in captivity (details under Relationships to Humans, “Illegal wildlife trade and captivity”).

=== Natural hazards and human disturbance ===
Volcanic eruptions (e.g., Mount Merapi), landslides, fallen nest trees, and severe storms cause direct mortality and nest destruction, while extended El Niño droughts lead to prey scarcity and nest desertion. Nests near forest edges are also vulnerable to illegal off-road motorbikes, uncontrolled visitor access, and hunting of prey animals. In addition, natural predators such as the common palm civet (Paradoxurus hermaphroditus) occasionally prey on eggs and nestlings.

== Relationships to humans ==
=== Cultural significance ===
The Javan hawk-eagle is closely associated with Garuda, the mythological bird and national emblem of Indonesia, because of its striking crest and physical features. On January 10, 1993, former President Soeharto declared the species Indonesia’s National Rare Animal (Satwa Langka Nasional) under Presidential Decree No. 4/1993. The designation was meant to raise conservation awareness and put the bird in the public eye, with its image appearing on national postage stamps, public banners, and telephone directory covers. The eagle also serves as a flagship and indicator species for conserving Java’s remaining tropical rainforest ecosystems.

=== Illegal wildlife trade and captivity ===
The national symbol status of the species had an unintended effect: it increased the bird’s prestige and market value among private collectors and aviculturists, driving a surge in illegal demand. Poachers take chicks and fledglings directly from nest trees, or catch dispersing juveniles with nets and traps. More than 70 individuals have been documented in commercial bird markets, zoos, and rescue centers. Birds are sold in urban markets, such as Pramuka Market in Jakarta and markets in Bandung, Surabaya, and Malang, as well as through online platforms. Asking prices in local bird markets averaged around US$40 (ranging from US$4 at capture sites to US$60 in major city markets like Jakarta).

Life in captivity is often fatal. Captive eagles in private collections and zoos (e.g., Taman Mini Indonesia Indah Bird Park, Surabaya Zoo, and Taman Safari) suffer high mortality because of inadequate facilities. A captive breeding program started by Indonesian zoos in the 1990s also failed because many birds died during invasive health checks (such as laparoscopy sexing), and no offspring were produced.

=== Legal protection and conservation ===
All diurnal raptors in Indonesia have been legally protected since 1970 (under Decree No. 421/Kpts/Um/8/8/1970), with stronger protection, including strict criminal penalties for poaching or possession (under Article 21(2) of Act R.I. No. 5 of 1990). Internationally, commercial trade is strictly regulated under CITES Appendix II.

Conservation planning began in the mid-1990s. After a Population and Habitat Viability Assessment (PHVA) in 1996, the Javan Hawk-Eagle Working Group (JHEWG) was formed in 1997 to coordinate research and protection. An official Javan Hawk-Eagle Recovery Plan followed in 1998, published by the Indonesian Ministry of Forestry (PHPA), the Indonesian Institute of Sciences (LIPI), the Ministry of Environment, BirdLife International, and partner NGOs. In 2000, the working group grew into Raptor Indonesia (RAIN). On the ground, community-based nest protection programs operate at key sites including Cibulao, Selabintana, Cimande, and Mount Salak. Specialized centers, such as the Cikananga Wildlife Rescue Centre and Suaka Elang (Raptor Sanctuary), rehabilitate confiscated birds for release into protected areas like Mount Gede Pangrango and Gunung Picis Nature Reserve.

== Status ==
=== IUCN and legal status ===
The Javan hawk-eagle is globally classified as Endangered (EN) on the IUCN Red List because of its small total population and ongoing habitat fragmentation across Java. It is legally protected in Indonesia, and its international trade is regulated under CITES Appendix II (see Relationships to Humans, “Legal protection and conservation initiatives”). It was also declared Indonesia’s National Rare Animal in 1993 (see “Cultural significance and national symbol”).

=== Population estimates and demography ===
Field assessments estimate the wild population at 137 to 188 breeding pairs, or roughly 600 to 1,000 individuals in total. Demographic models and museum records give an adult-to-non-adult ratio of 1:1.3, which points to active recruitment of young birds in wild subpopulations. The remaining pairs are spread across 21 to 24 major forest blocks. The largest concentrations are in West Java (Mount Halimun-Salak with 16-25 pairs and South Bandung with 23-30 pairs) and East Java (Ijen-Raung with 21-28 pairs and Meru Betiri with 13-17 pairs). Forest remnants in Central Java hold about 15% of the global population and act as a genetic bridge between the western and eastern populations.

=== Threats and conservation ===
The main pressures on the species are habitat loss and fragmentation, illegal capture for the pet trade, and natural hazards (see Threats). Conservation efforts include legal protection, a national recovery plan, community nest protection, and rescue and rehabilitation centers (see Relationships to Humans, “Legal protection and conservation initiatives”).
