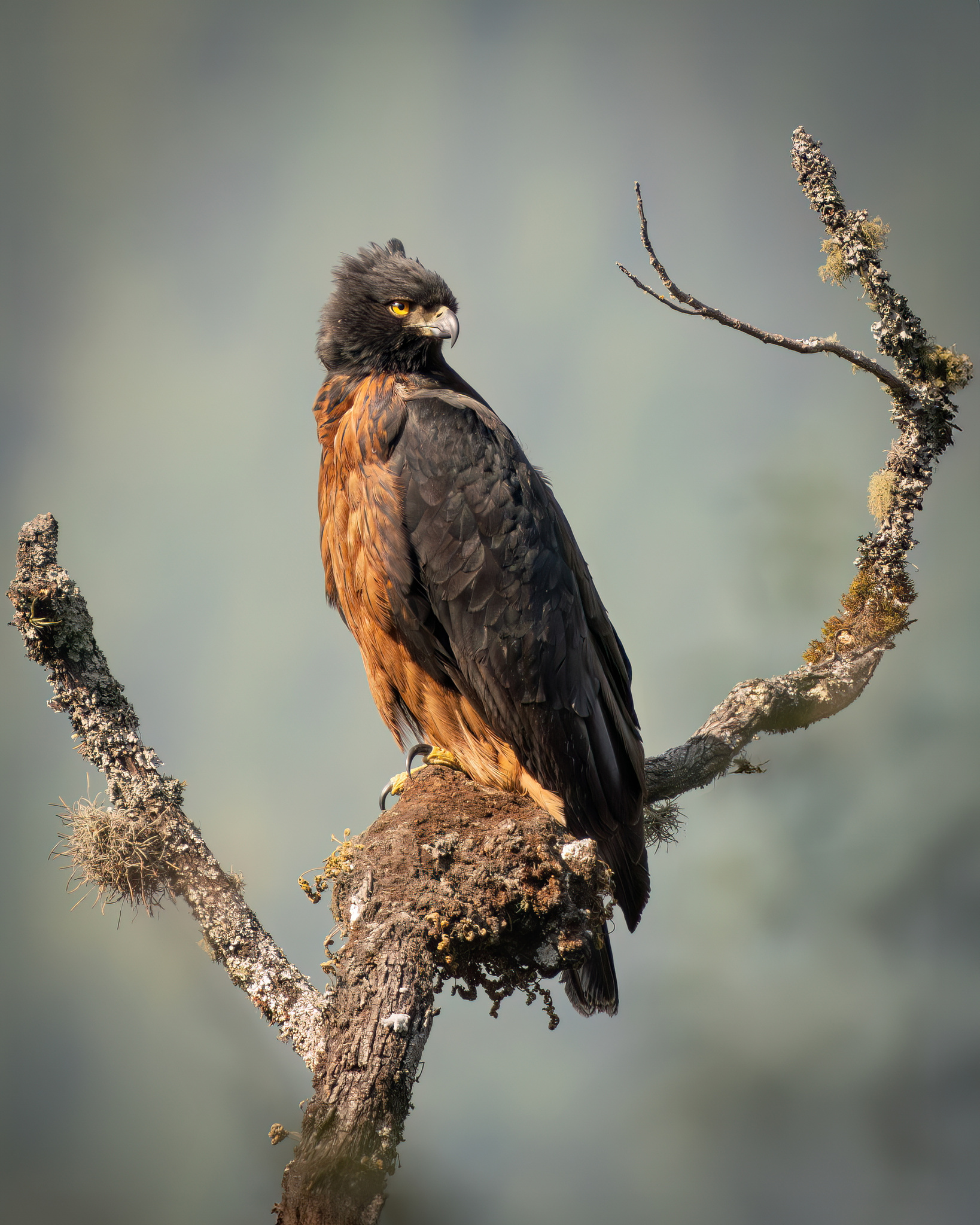

Conservation status
- Endangered (IUCN 3.1)

Scientific classification
- Kingdom: Animalia
- Phylum: Chordata
- Class: Aves
- Order: Accipitriformes
- Family: Accipitridae
- Genus: Spizaetus
- Species: S. isidori

Binomial name
- Spizaetus isidori (Des Murs, 1845)
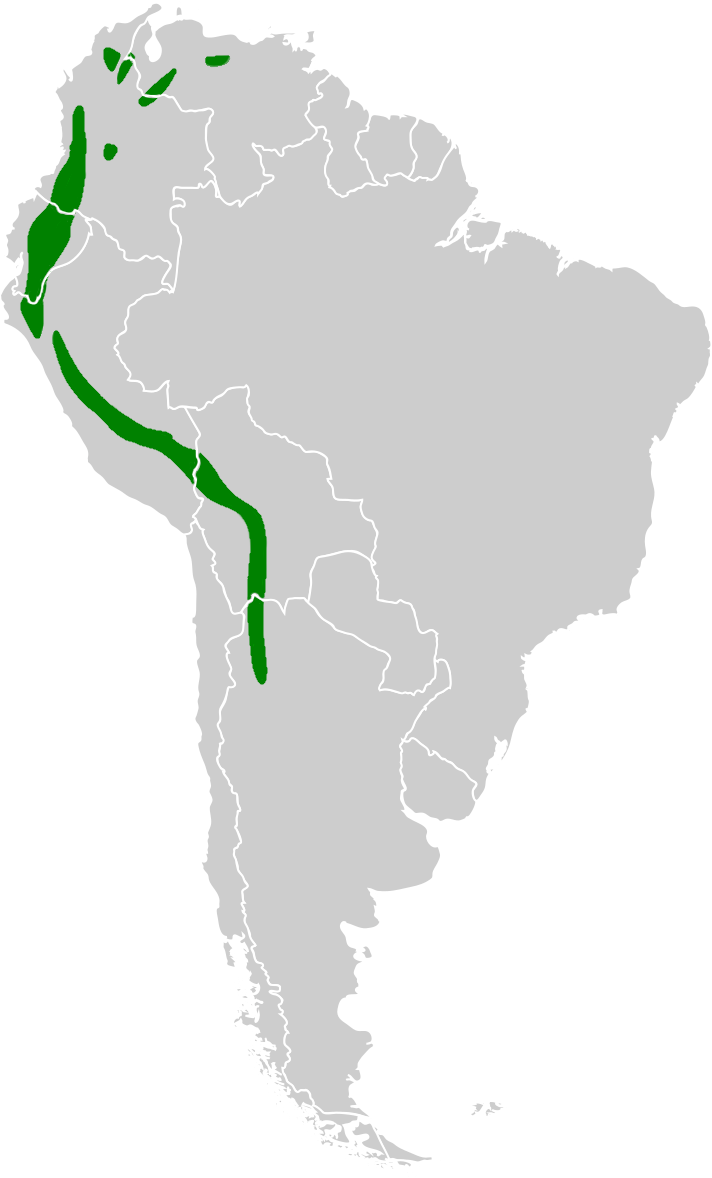

Synonyms
- Oroaetus isidori (Des Murs, 1845)

= Black-and-chestnut eagle =

Species of bird

The black-and-chestnut eagle (Spizaetus isidori), also known as Isidor's eagle, is a large South American species of bird of prey in the family Accipitridae. It is often placed in the monotypic genus Oroaetus. However, recent genetic testing indicates that this species is fairly closely related to Spizaetus species and thus the species should be included in that genus. The black-and-chestnut eagle is a typical forest raptor, hunting primarily small to medium-sized mammals and birds and constructing a large nest in a tall tree. Unfortunately, the twin causes of habitat destruction and persecution have caused population declines and the black-and-chestnut eagle is considered to be an Endangered species by the IUCN.

== Taxonomy ==
Its scientific name was chosen in honour of French zoologist, Isidore Geoffroy Saint-Hilaire.

== Habitat and status ==
It is found in humid montane forests, normally at elevations between 1,800 to 2,500 m (5,900 to 8,200 ft), in the Andes from northern Argentina, through Bolivia, Peru, Ecuador, Colombia, to Venezuela, with isolated populations in the Venezuelan Coastal Range, Serranía del Perijá and Sierra Nevada de Santa Marta. It is generally local and rare. Widespread cutting of primary forest in foothills throughout the Andes is the primary cause of the precipitous decline of this species. Deforestation in the forests of the Andes is rampant as in much of the tropics. There are an estimated 1,400-4,200 mature individuals of black-and-chestnut eagles left in the wild as of 2024. Further exacerbating the species' conservation issues are its continued persecution as a killer of domestic fowl. Black-and-chestnut eagles are a control species because they help to maintain the balance of ecosystems by hunting other animals for food.

== Description ==
It is a fairly large eagle and very large raptor at 60 to 80 cm (24 to 31 in) in total length with a wingspan of 147 to 180 cm (4 ft 10 in to 5 ft 11 in). It is largest current member of the genus Spizaetus, with the smallest males somewhat larger linearly than the largest female ornate hawk-eagles. Full grown weights for black-and-chestnut eagles have been reported as 1.5 to 3.5 kg (3.3 to 7.7 lb), making it among neotropic eagles around the same body size as the two largest Buteogallus and the black-chested buzzard-eagle, at least twice as heavy as other Spizaetus and slightly heavier than the notably longer crested eagle. Only the harpy eagle is considerably larger among all neotropical eagles, with most other eagles absent from the high elevation forest home of the black-and-chestnut eagle apart from the solitary eagle. For its genus and for many genera of forest-dwelling raptors in general, it has a proportionately short tail and proportionately long wings but still it is longer tailed and shorter winged than most true open country eagles. Females are notably larger as is typical in raptors, by about 4% to 14%, and longer tailed. The wing chord and tail length is 463 to 488 mm (18.2 to 19.2 in) and 283 to 300 mm (11.1 to 11.8 in) in males, respectively, and 508 to 528 mm (20.0 to 20.8 in) and 329 to 335 mm (13.0 to 13.2 in) in females. A small sample of these eagles measured 110 to 120 mm (4.3 to 4.7 in) in tarsus length. The talons of this species are very large and formidable for the size of the eagle, averaging 50.9 mm (2.00 in) in 6 females and 46.4 mm (1.83 in) in 6 males along the enlarged hallux claw (their main killing apparatus), thus nearly as large as a much bigger eagle such as a golden eagle.

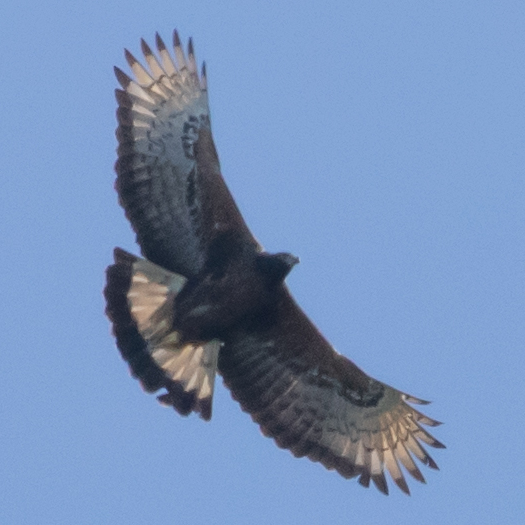
Adult

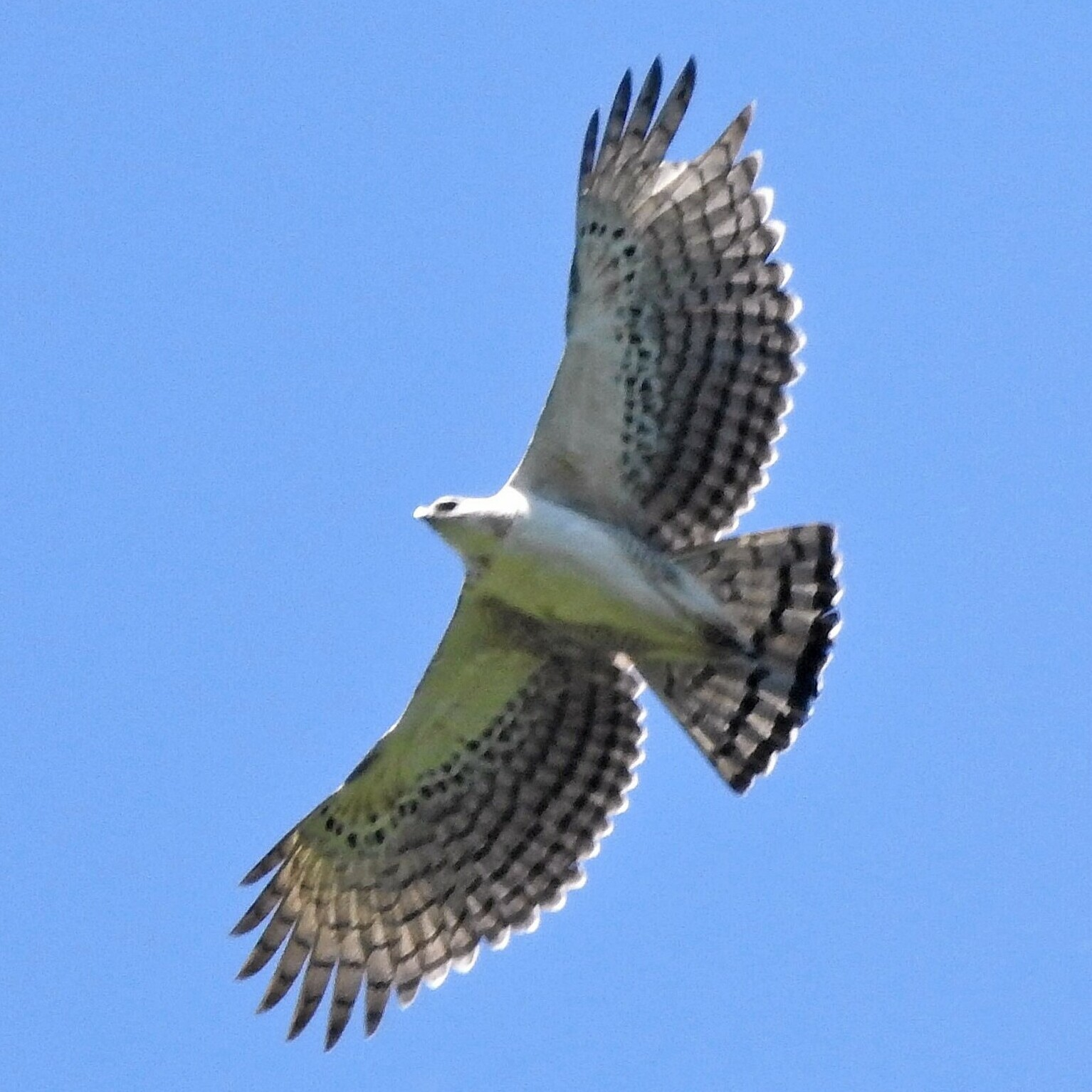
Juvenile

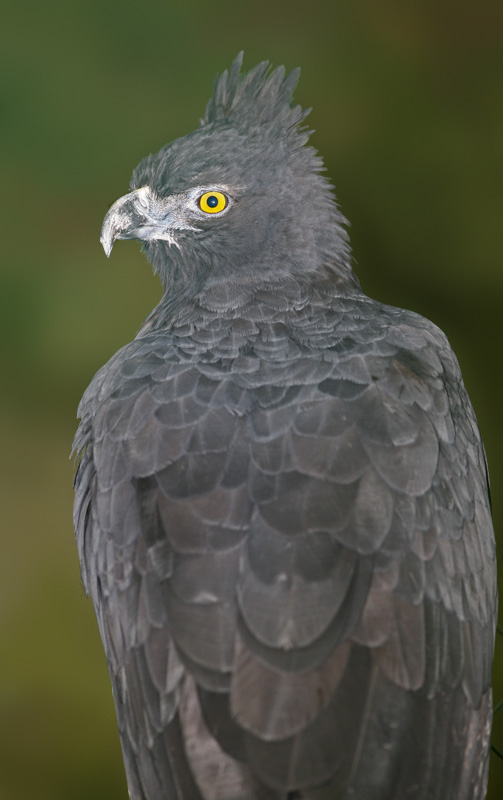
Close-up of an adult's face and back.

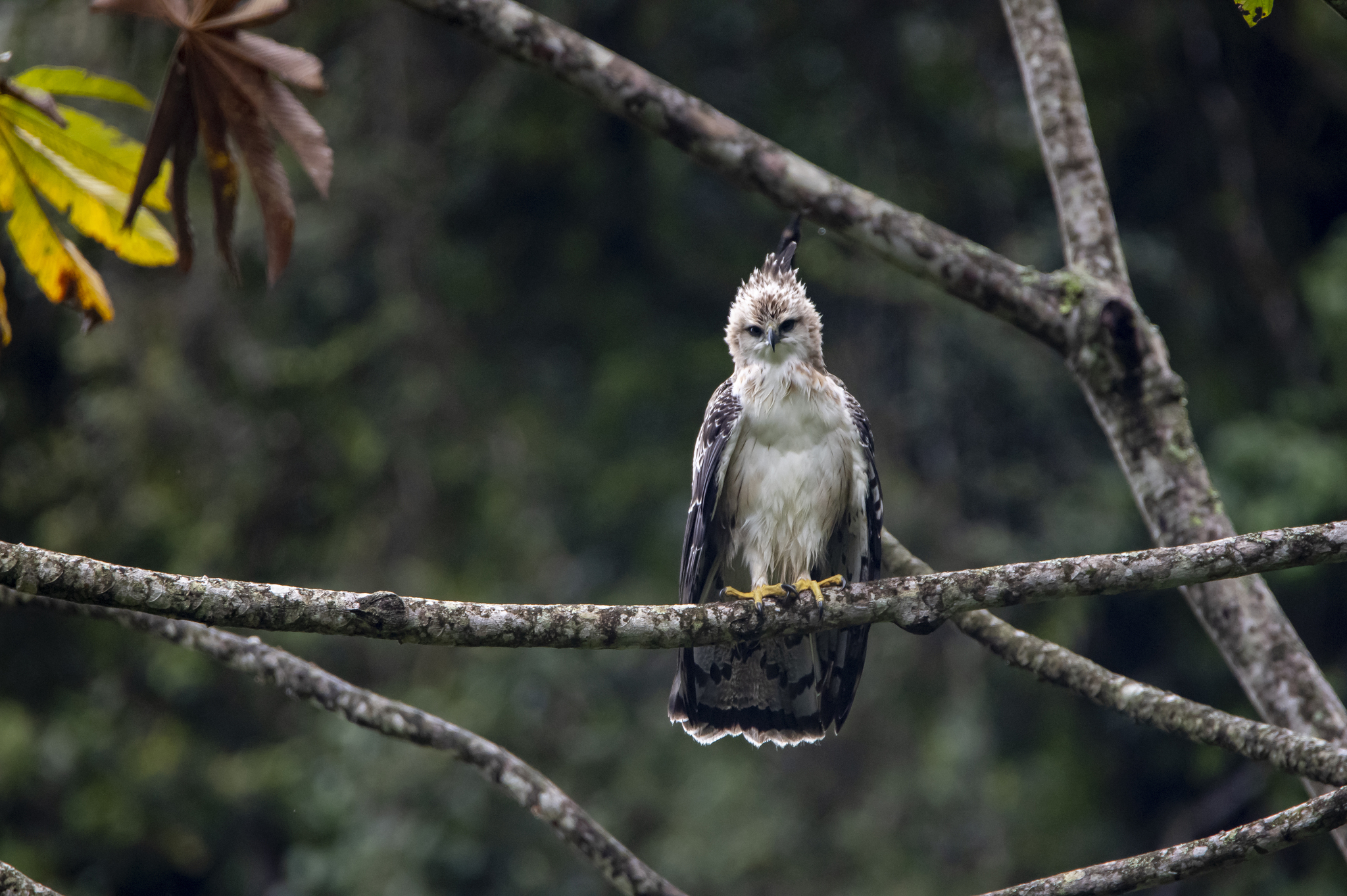
Juvenile

As an adult, this species is glossy black on the head and the back and a rich and somewhat streaky chestnut on the underside, much of the wing secondaries and even on its legs. The black-tipped white feathers on the wing primaries contrast strongly with the chestnut secondaries and underwing coverts. The adult's tail is grayish with a thick black subterminal band. Adult black-and-chestnut eagles have orange-yellow eyes and yellow bare parts but for the somewhat proportionately small gray bill. The juvenile bird is very different, being whitish over the head and body with a buffy wash underneath and scaly grey-brown on the back and mantle, somewhat more extensive than in other whitish juvenile Spizaetus. The wings are whitish on juveniles where adults are chestnut and the remaining wing feathers of the juvenile have a much more varying black-and-white pattern. The tail of juveniles has two strong black bands. The juvenile's eye is blue-gray, later becoming yellow before becoming orangish at maturity. Maturity is obtained gradually over four years, about average for a large eagle but nearly twice as long as some other Spizaetus species. Adult black-and-chestnut eagles are practically unmistakable, unless seen only dorsally and then can be distinguished from the black hawk-eagle by its larger, much bulkier frame and distinctive tail pattern on a conspicuously relatively shorter tail. Black-and-chestnut juveniles are more reminiscent of juveniles of both other Spizaetus species but are distinctly larger, bulkier and proportionately shorter tailed than both and each species has somewhat distinctive juvenile patterns on the wing primaries and tail. The black-and-white hawk-eagle is particularly far smaller and, unlike the ornate hawk-eagle, is not known to take up occasional residency in cloud forests. Also juvenile pale morph crested eagles can appear surprisingly similar in flight to juvenile black-and-chestnut eagles but are conspicuously longer tailed with a stronger barring pattern. Furthermore, there is little to no overlap with the other species of the genus as well as crested eagles due to the distinct habitat used by the black-and-chestnut. The solitary eagle is unlikely to be mistaken, being much broader winged and lacks all chestnut pigment, furthermore having an almost inverse tail pattern to adult black-and-chestnuts on a rather shorter tail. Unlike other crested raptors, it is reported that the crest of the black-and-chestnut eagle is held upright during calm periods of time and in flight and more likely to be held flat in stressful circumstances.

== Ecology ==
Nest building is February and March, laying eggs in April and May and fledgling young by August and September. It builds a huge stick nest about 2 m (6.6 ft) across and 1 m (3.3 ft) deep. Clutches include 1 to 2 fledglings. At the nest area in some areas, adults primarily appeared to bring squirrels to feed their young. In Argentina, it was recorded that the female visited the nest more times and invested more time into nest building than males do. The female was responsible for the incubation and incubated every night in Argentina, while the male provided prey for both and briefly incubated when the female went out of the nest. After hatching, the female does all of the chick covering, feeding and defense were only carried out by the female, whereas the male provided prey. These are typical parental behaviors by raptors and eagles, but seem somewhat more rigidly divided in this species as the male never appears to take on brooding responsibilities in the black-and-chestnut eagle.

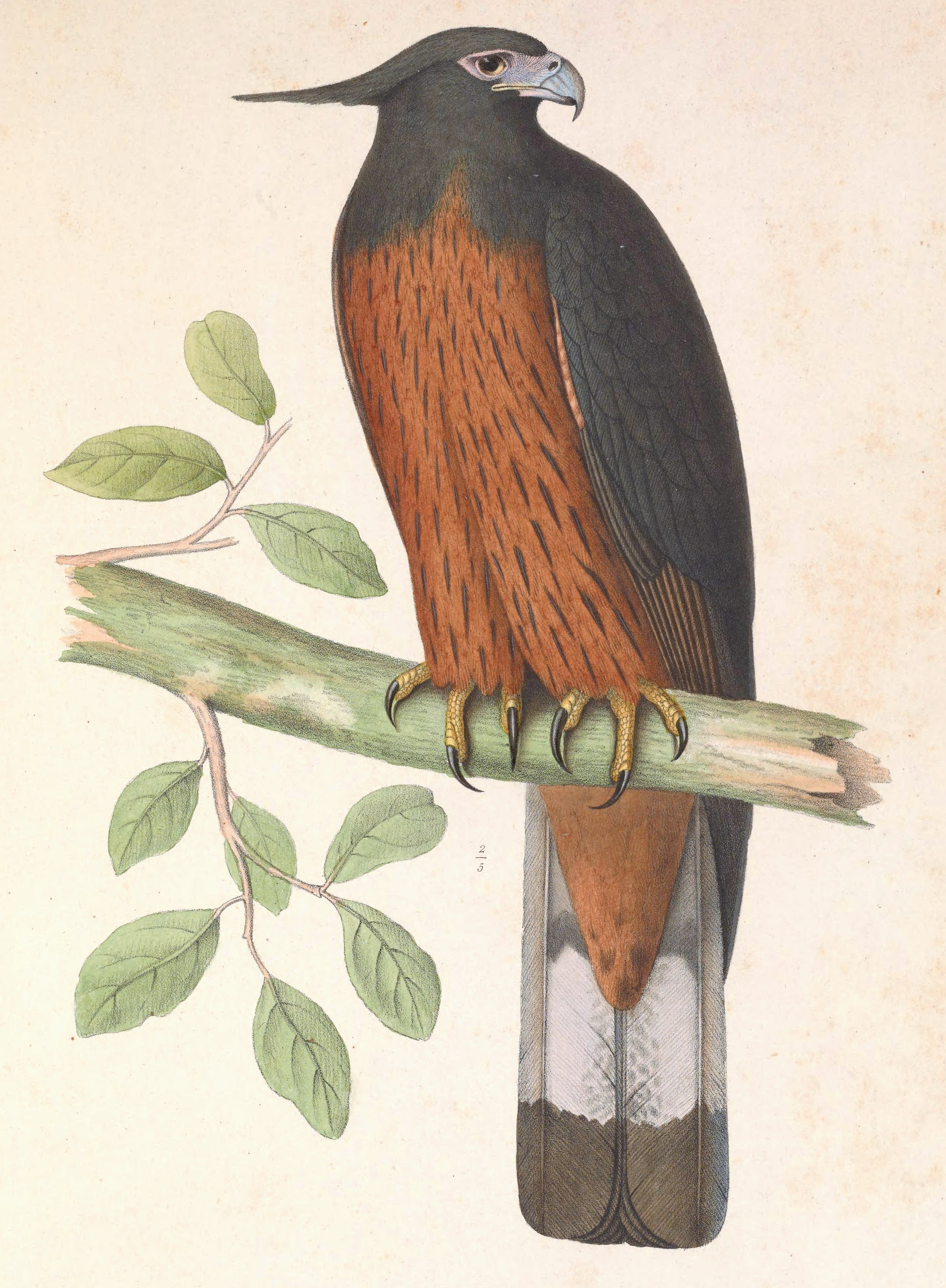
A 19th century painting of an adult black-and-chestnut eagle.

Black-and-chestnut eagle hunts primarily in the canopy. They are prone to soaring frequently and tend to be rarely seen perched. This species has powerful legs and talons specialized for taking large prey. They frequently have much-abraded tails by plunging after prey through the branches. The main prey is usually small-to-mid-sized arboreal mammals including red-tailed squirrels (Sciurus granatensis), opossums (Didelphis sp.), and stump-tailed porcupines (Coendou rufescens). Occasionally, they will take carnivorans such as kinkajous (Potos flavus) and coatis (Nasuella olivacea & Nasua nasua) as well as monkeys such as gray-bellied night monkeys (Aotus lemurinus), tufted capuchin (Sapajus apella), and woolly monkeys (Lagothrix lagothricha). Birds are important prey in some regions, mainly domestic chickens and guans such as Andean guans (Penelope montagnii) and Sickle-winged Guans (Chamaepetes goudotii), though smaller birds such as Band-tailed pigeons (Patagioenas fasciata) are also taken. Because of the species' predation of chickens, including standard-sized adults, it is sometimes persecuted by farmers, who typically lose 1–2 chickens to predation by S. isidiori annually.

They overlap in range with several other large forest eagles, including other Spizaetus eagles, but few interactions have been reported and, as they often occur at slightly different altitudes than other neotropic forest eagles, the black-and-chestnut eagle is believed to be normally the top avian predator in its range. One exception is the similarly sized solitary eagle, which preliminary reports suggests mostly hunts snakes, whereas the black-and-chestnut eagle seems to prefer birds and small-to-mid-sized mammals, and the two species were observed flying near each other without aggression in southeastern Peru since prey partitioning appears to allow them to co-exist. One species seen to be aggressively displaced by the black-and-chestnut eagles here was the turkey vulture, possibly because they sometimes steal eggs from bird's nests.
