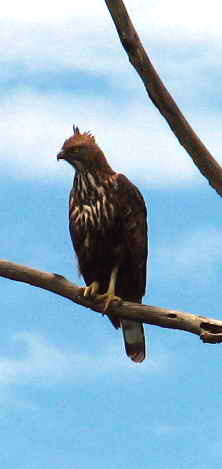
- Changeable hawk-eagle Nisaetus cirrhatus

Scientific classification
- Kingdom: Animalia
- Phylum: Chordata
- Class: Aves
- Order: Accipitriformes
- Family: Accipitridae
- Subfamily: Aquilinae
- Genus: Nisaetus; Hodgson, 1836

Type species
- Nisaetus nipalensis Hodgson, 1836

Species
- Nisaetus alboniger (Blyth, 1845); Nisaetus bartelsi Stresemann, 1924; Nisaetus cirrhatus (Gmelin, 1788); Nisaetus floris (E. Hartert, 1898); Nisaetus kelaarti (Legge, 1878); Nisaetus lanceolatus Temminck & Schlegel, 1844; Nisaetus nanus Wallace, 1868; Nisaetus nipalensis (Hodgson, 1836); Nisaetus philippensis Gould, 1863; Nisaetus pinskeri Preleuthner and Gamauf, 1998

= Nisaetus =

Genus of birds

Nisaetus, the crested hawk-eagles, is a genus of raptor in the subfamily Aquilinae, found mainly in tropical Asia. They were earlier placed within the genus Spizaetus but molecular studies show that the Old World representatives of that genus are closer to the genus Ictinaetus than to the New World Spizaetus (in the stricter sense). They are slender-bodied, medium-sized hawk-eagles with rounded wings, long feathered legs, barred wings, crests and usually adapted to forest habitats.

== Taxonomy and species ==
These Old World species were formerly placed in the genus Spizaetus. They were moved to the resurrected genus Nisaetus based on the results of molecular genetic studies published in 2005 and 2007. The genus Nisaetus had been introduced in 1836 by the English naturalist Brian Houghton Hodgson with the mountain hawk-eagle as the type species. The genus name Nisaetus combines the Medieval Latin nisus for a sparrowhawk with the Ancient Greek aetos meaning "eagle". The genus contains ten species.

Image	Scientific name	Common name	Distribution
	Nisaetus kelaarti (Legge, 1878)	Legge's hawk-eagle	southern India to Sri Lanka
	Nisaetus nanus Wallace, 1868	Wallace's hawk-eagle	Brunei, Indonesia, Malaysia, Myanmar, and Thailand
	Nisaetus nipalensis (Hodgson, 1836)	Mountain hawk-eagle	India, Nepal to Thailand, Taiwan and Japan
	Nisaetus alboniger (Blyth, 1845)	Blyth's hawk-eagle	Malay Peninsula, Singapore, Sumatra and Borneo
	Nisaetus bartelsi Stresemann, 1924	Javan hawk-eagle	Java
	Nisaetus lanceolatus Temminck & Schlegel, 1844	Sulawesi hawk-eagle	Sulawesi and its satellite islands of Buton, Muna, Banggai and Sula Islands
	Nisaetus pinskeri Preleuthner and Gamauf, 1998	Pinsker's hawk-eagle	Leyte, Samar, Negros and Mindanao in the Philippines
	Nisaetus philippensis Gould, 1863	Philippine hawk-eagle	Philippines
	Nisaetus cirrhatus (Gmelin, 1788)	Changeable hawk-eagle	India and Sri Lanka, and from the southeast rim of the Himalaya across Southeast Asia to Indonesia and the Philippines
	Nisaetus floris (E. Hartert, 1898)	Flores hawk-eagle	Flores, Lombok and Sumbawa in the Lesser Sundas
