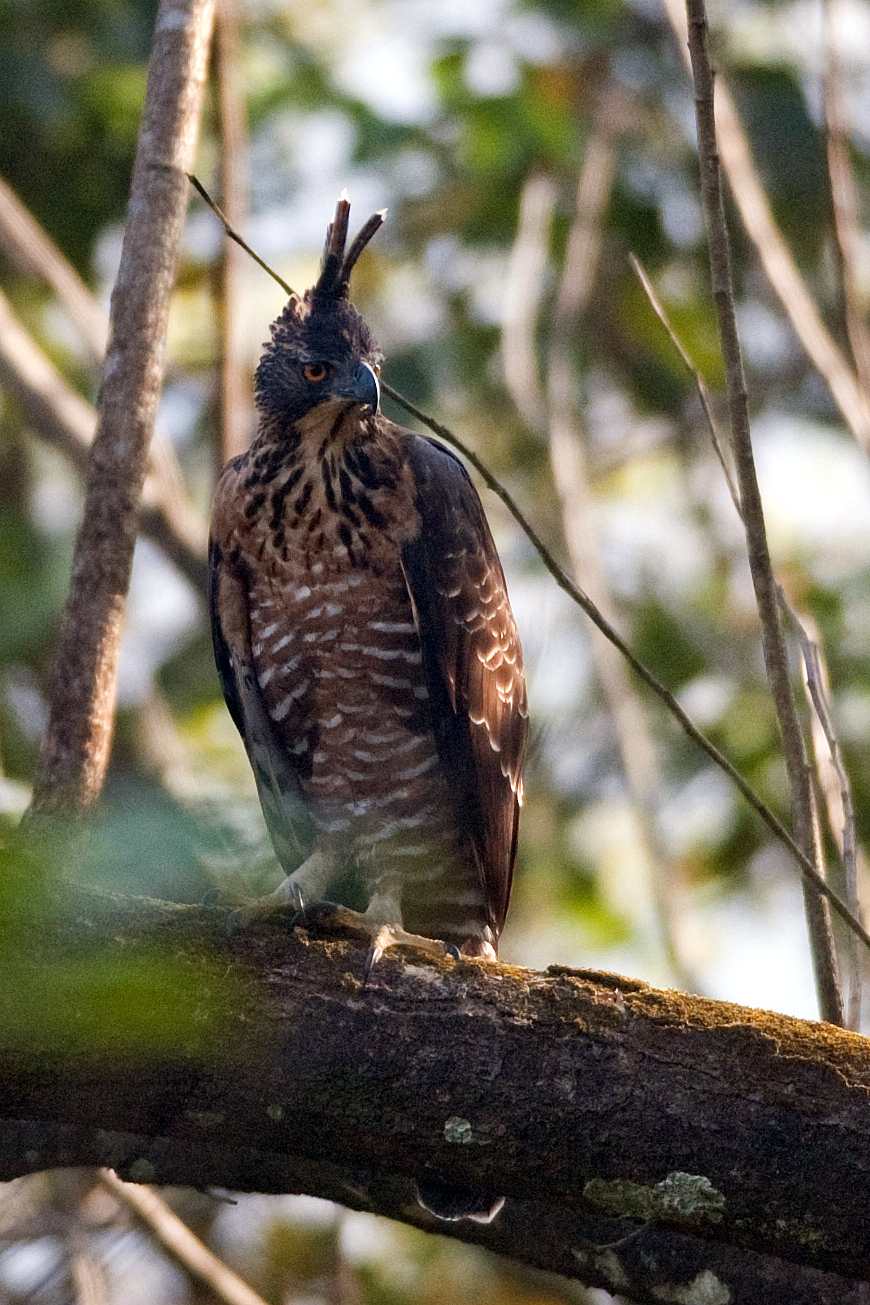
- Nisaetus kelaarti, Thattekad Bird Sanctuary

Scientific classification
- Kingdom: Animalia
- Phylum: Chordata
- Class: Aves
- Order: Accipitriformes
- Family: Accipitridae
- Genus: Nisaetus
- Species: N. kelaarti

Binomial name
- Nisaetus kelaarti (Legge, 1878)

Synonyms
- Spizaetus kelaarti Nisaetus nipalensis kelaarti

= Legge's hawk-eagle =

Species of bird

Legge's hawk-eagle (Nisaetus kelaarti) is a bird of prey. Like all eagles, it is in the family Accipitridae. It breeds in the Indian subcontinent, from southern India to Sri Lanka. Its specific name kelaarti honors the physician-zoologist E.F. Kelaart. The English common name honours William Vincent Legge, who described the species in 1878.

Legge's hawk-eagle is a medium-sized eagle and fairly large-sized raptor. The typical adult has brown upperparts and pale underparts, with barring on the undersides of the flight feathers and tail. The breast and belly are heavily streaked. The wings are broad with a curved trailing edge, and are held in a shallow V in flight. Sexes are similar, but young birds are often whiter-headed.

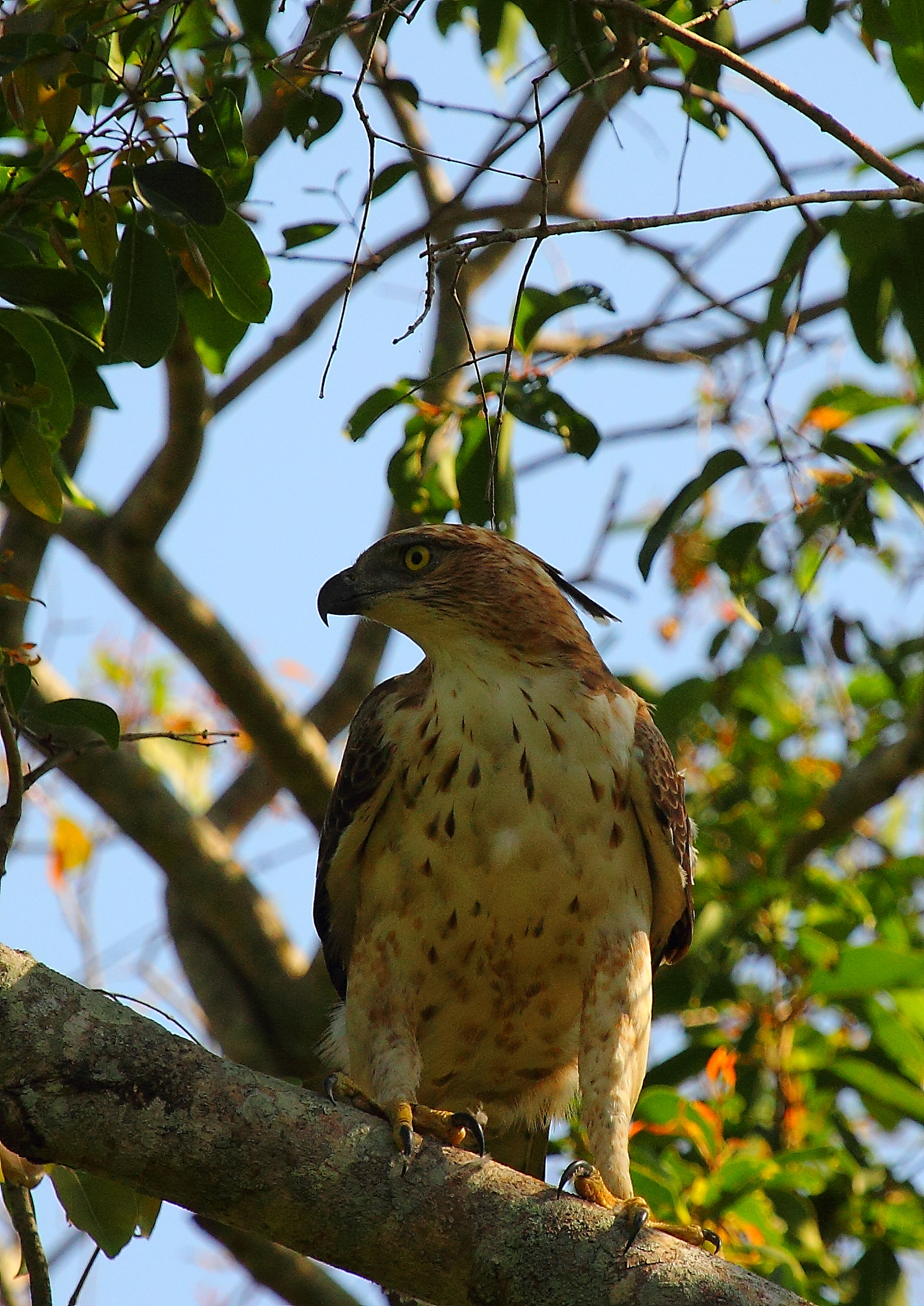
A Legge's hawk-eagle photographed in Sri Lanka.

Legge's hawk-eagle was formerly considered to be a subspecies of the mountain hawk-eagle, but it is smaller and has unstreaked buff underwing coverts. A 2008 study based on the geographic isolation and differences in call suggested that this be treated as a full species, Nisaetus kelaarti. When all standard measurements are considered, Legge's hawk-eagles average about 5-10% smaller than mountain hawk eagles, although Legge's tail length is slightly greater on average. Furthermore, one male from Sri Lanka weighed 1.93 kg (4.3 lb), slightly less than most male mountain hawk-eagles. In average total length, males Legge's hawk-eagles average about 70 cm (28 in) and females average about 76 cm (30 in).

It is a bird of mountain woodland that builds a stick nest in a tree and lays usually a single egg in a clutch. Legge's hawk-eagles eat small mammals, birds and reptiles. Despite its relatively modest size, Legge's hawk-eagle is a powerful predator with large talons, like many booted eagles, and is sometimes known to occasionally pursue prey as heavy or heavier than itself. This may include Indian peafowl, estimated to weigh 2.8 to 4 kg (6.2 to 8.8 lb).

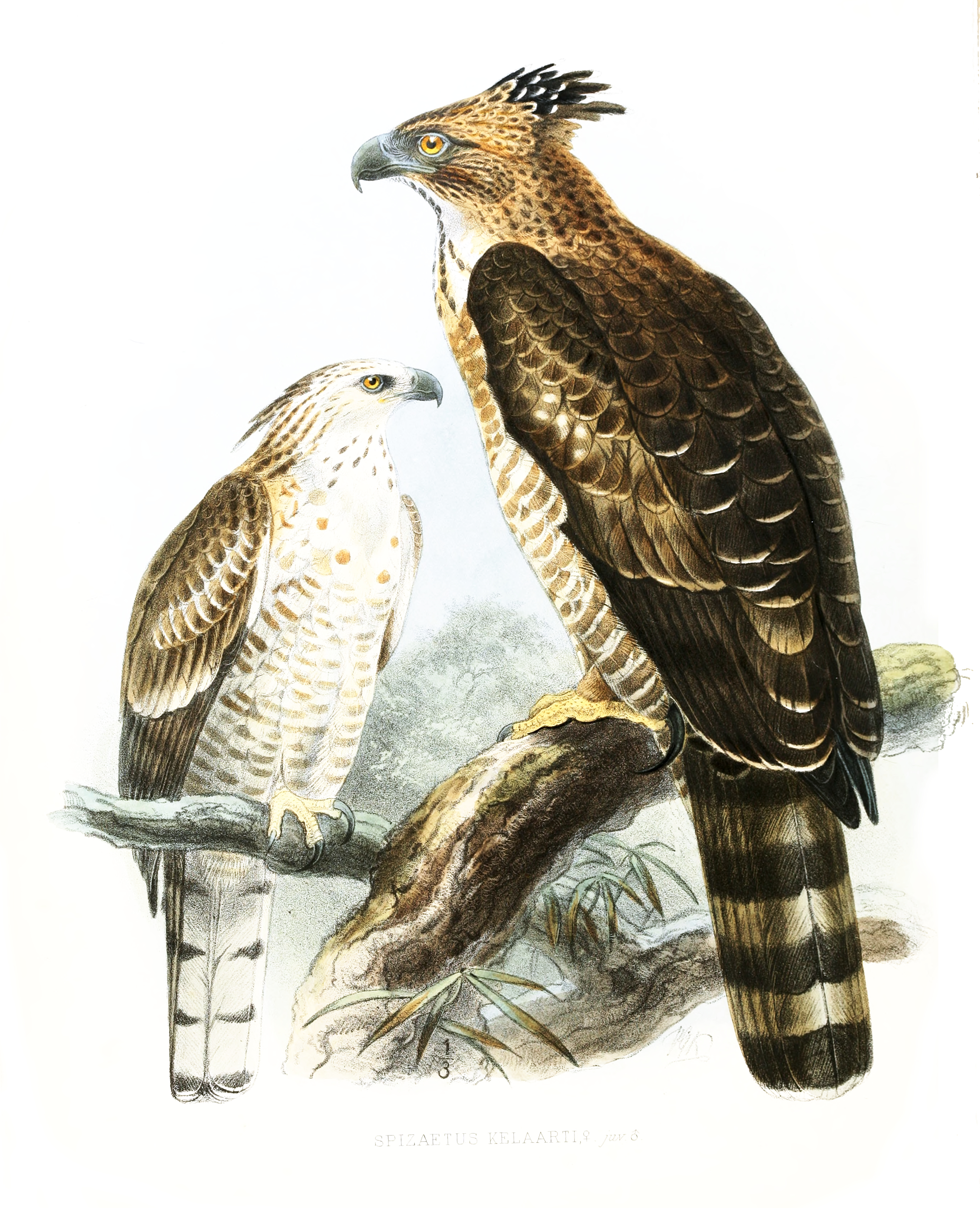
Nisaetus kelaarti
