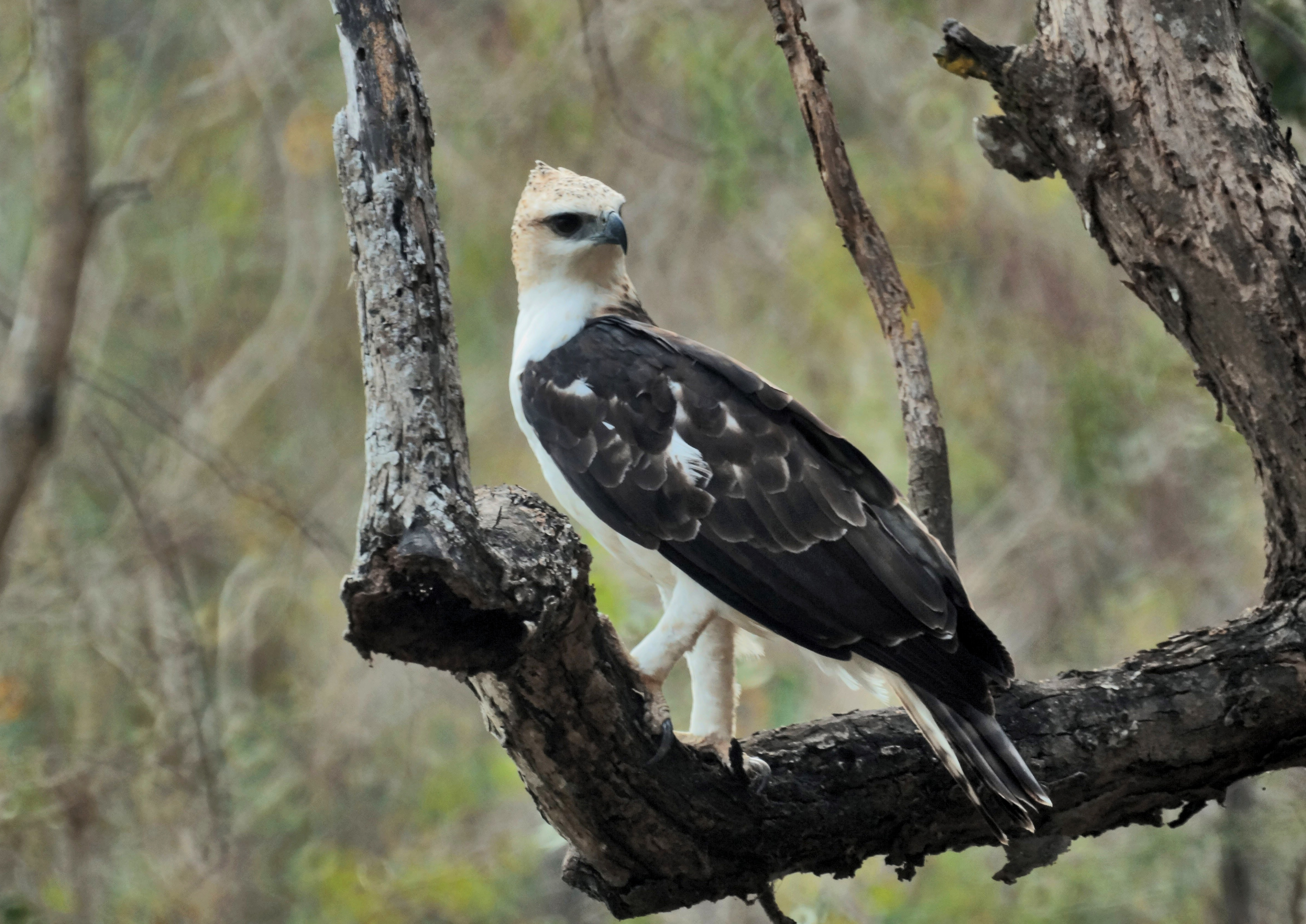

Conservation status
- Endangered (IUCN 3.1)

Scientific classification
- Kingdom: Animalia
- Phylum: Chordata
- Class: Aves
- Order: Accipitriformes
- Family: Accipitridae
- Genus: Nisaetus
- Species: N. floris

Binomial name
- Nisaetus floris (Hartert, 1898)

Synonyms
- Spizaetus floris (protonym)

= Flores hawk-eagle =

Species of bird

The Flores hawk-eagle (Nisaetus floris) is a large raptor in the family Accipitridae. It is an endemic species to the Lesser Sunda Islands in Indonesia. A member of the genus Nisaetus, it was considered as a subspecies of and conspecific with the changeable hawk-eagle but genetic studies have evidenced it as a legitimate species. A forest dwelling predator, this species is classified as endangered due to habitat loss and persecution.

== Description ==
Adults have dark brown upperparts, a brown tail with six bars, a white patch in the wings that is visible in flight, white underparts, and a white head with fine brownish streaks on the crown (many books erroneously illustrate adults with largely brown heads). Furthermore, they have sparse light dark markings about the thighs. The white patches at the upperside of the primaries are a species diagnostic. Furthermore, the tail has 6, not 4–5, bars. It has traditionally been treated as a subspecies of the changeable hawk-eagle; at least in part because of confusion over the true adult plumage of the Flores hawk-eagle, which resembles the juvenile of the changeable hawk-eagle. Unlike that species, adult and juvenile Flores hawk-eagles are quite similar. Unlike some changeable hawk-eagles and many other Nisaetus, Flores hawk-eagles lack a head crest.

What data is available shows Flores hawk-eagles are a fair bit larger than the changeable hawk-eagle. The total length is usually reported at 75 to 79 cm (30 to 31 in) but may range from 71 to 82 cm (28 to 32 in). Claims it may measure as little as 60 cm (24 in) are probably due to confusion with other hawk-eagle species. The reported total lengths put in contention with the mountain hawk-eagle as the largest of all Nisaetus but the mountain species appears to significantly larger winged and more heavily built than the Flores species, which has the gracile and long-tailed form like the changeable hawk-eagle. However, no published weights are known for the Flores hawk-eagle. One paper estimated a body mass of around 2 kg (4.4 lb) for the Flores hawk-eagle. The wing chord of the Flores hawk-eagle is 430 to 462 mm (16.9 to 18.2 in).

== Range and habitat ==
An Indonesian endemic, the Flores hawk-eagle is distributed in forests of Flores, Lombok and Sumbawa in the Lesser Sundas. It mainly occurs in lowlands, but has been recorded at altitudes as high as 1,600 metres (5,250 ft). The Flores hawk-eagle is known to be reliant on tropical rainforest. Most frequently they are seen flying over the canopy over slight slopes of the forest. They are sometimes reported as foraging over cultivations but this is only in areas adjacent to large stretches of forest. The use of both lowland and somewhat montane forest may be dictated by the extent of remnant forest.

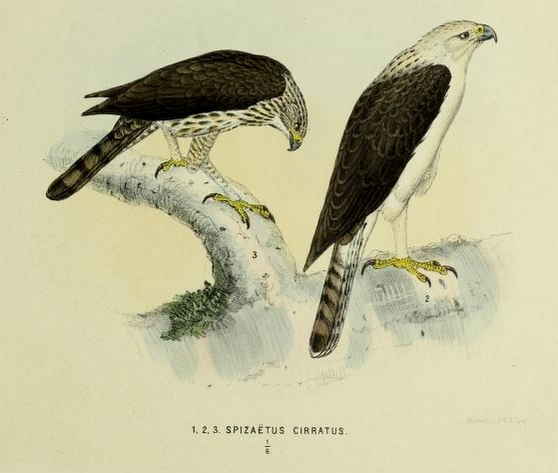
19th century art depicting a Flores hawk-eagle.

== Ecology ==
Though clearly sedentary and non-migratory as are most tropical raptors, Flores hawk-eagles can disperse widely, mainly after their young disperse from their parent's range. Clearly, given their distribution across multiple islands, they are capable of crossing narrow straits. The call has been recorded as a loud, shrill and prolonged whistle. Next to nothing is known of the diet of Flores hawk-eagles. What is presumed is largely projected from related species, such as their presumed propensity for perch hunting. The presumed diet may consist of birds, lizards, snakes and mammals, but again this may be extrapolated from the diet of other hawk-eagles. Incidences of predation by this species on snakes have been observed and one Flores hawk-eagle was seen carrying what was thought to be a rail. Suspected predation by Flores hawk-eagles has been reported on large flying foxes. Nest activity by the species has been reported in March, April, May and August, with one downed tree reported by locals as containing a nest with a large eaglet in the latter month. Based on what little activity has been recorded, it appears that Flores hawk-eagle breeding season occurs during the dry season. No further details, including clutch size, egg appearance, incubation, parental behaviour or fledging, are known of their breeding habits.

== Status ==
Due to ongoing habitat loss within its small range, capture for the cage bird trade and persecution due to its habit of taking chickens, the Flores hawk-eagle is evaluated as endangered on the IUCN Red List of Threatened Species. It is probably the world's rarest eagle species. Poaching may be ongoing and trappers may even come from other islands to kill these birds. However, the Flores hawk-eagle was once considered in western Flores be a "totem" or "empo," i.e., a human ancestor, and was not persecuted or killed but habitat destruction may have been long negatively effecting the species. Educational efforts have been undertaken to try to ensure local people's coexistence with this predatory bird. It is estimated that less than 100 pairs remain, based on a per pair occupancy of about 40 km^{2} (15 sq mi). A more specific estimate put the total at about 75 projected pairs, with 10 pairs on Lombok, 38 pairs on Sumbawa, and 27 pairs on Flores.
