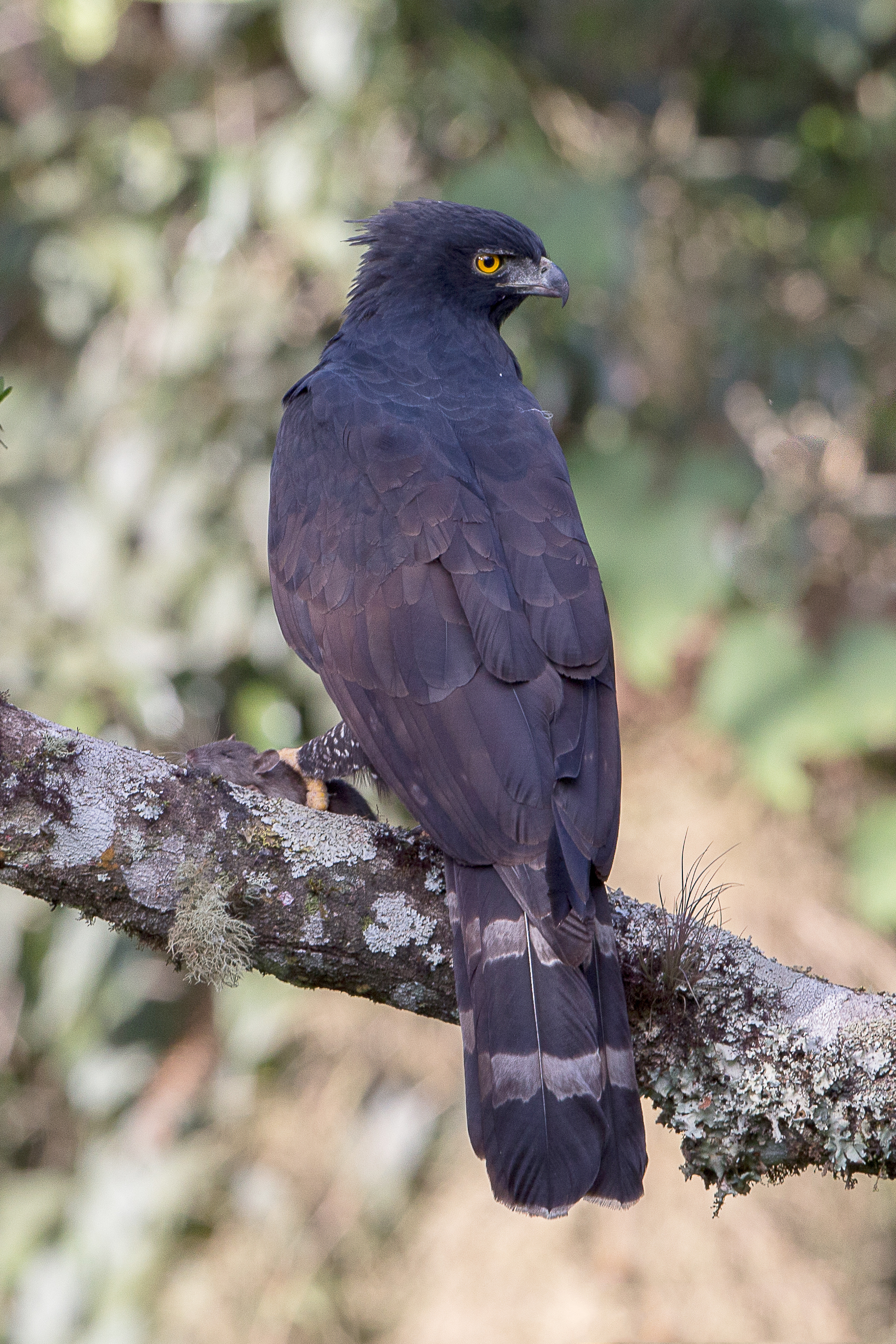

Conservation status
- Least Concern (IUCN 3.1)

Scientific classification
- Kingdom: Animalia
- Phylum: Chordata
- Class: Aves
- Order: Accipitriformes
- Family: Accipitridae
- Genus: Spizaetus
- Species: S. tyrannus

Binomial name
- Spizaetus tyrannus (Wied, 1820)

Subspecies
- S. t. serus - Friedmann, 1950; S. t. tyrannus - (Wied-Neuwied, 1820)

= Black hawk-eagle =

Species of bird

The black hawk-eagle (Spizaetus tyrannus), also known as the tyrant hawk-eagle, is a species of eagle found from central Mexico through Central America into the south of Brazil to Colombia, eastern Peru, and as far as northern Argentina. There are two known subspecies, S.t. tyrannus, which is found in Southeastern Brazil and Northeastern Argentina, and the slightly smaller S. t. serus, which can be found elsewhere throughout the species' range. Its preferred habitats include humid and moist forests close to rivers, and several types of woodland. It is uncommon to fairly common throughout most of its range. Its closest relative is the ornate hawk-eagle, which is similar in size, appearance and behavior but lives at lower elevations.

== Description ==
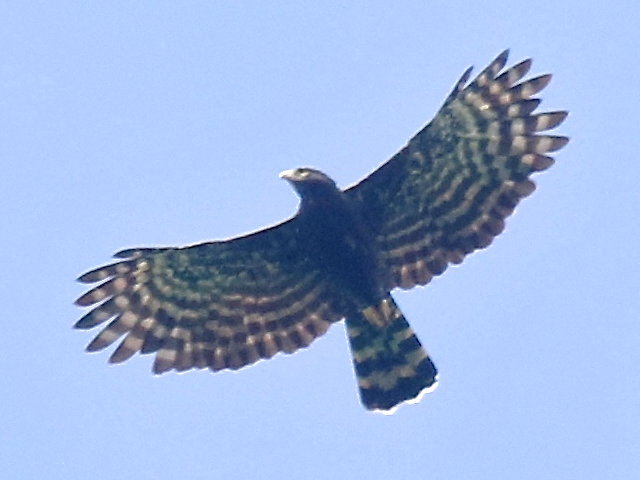
Ailigandí area, Panama

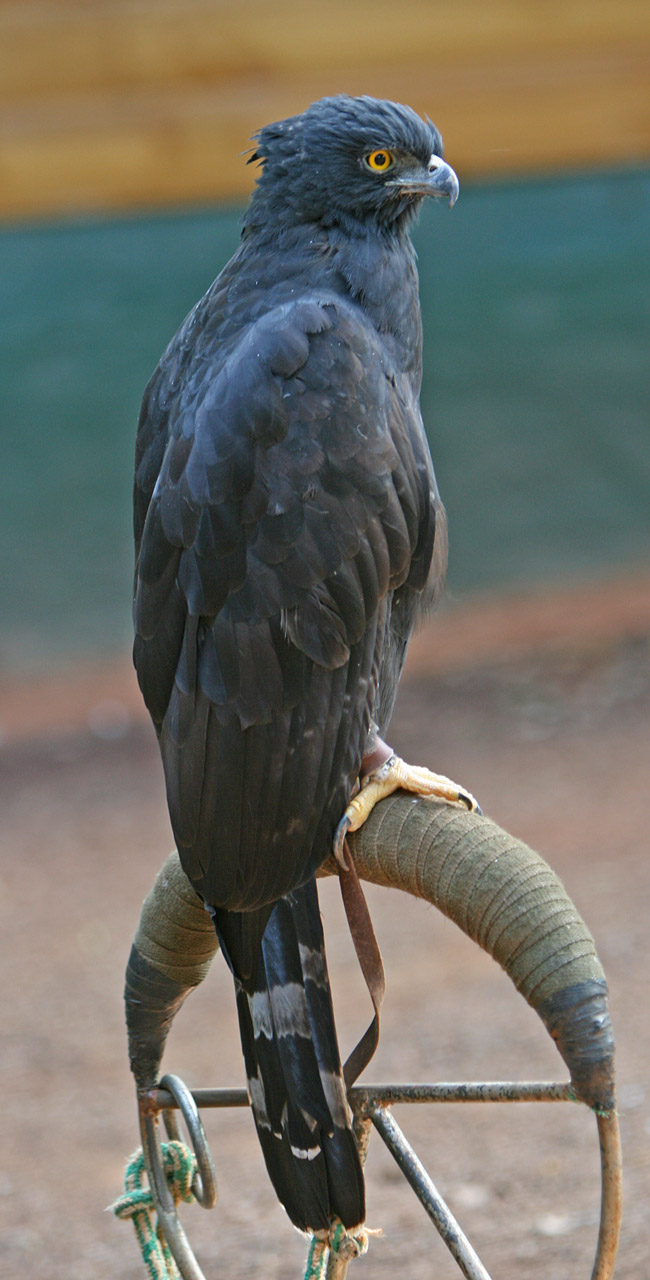
A captive adult black hawk-eagle.

The black hawk-eagle is 58–70 cm (23–27.5 in) long and weighs about 900 to 1,300 grams (2.0 to 2.9 pounds). It has black plumage with varying patterns on its wings and body, and white speckling in places. It has barred wings, slightly elliptical in shape, and a long, narrow tail which is rarely fanned. The four grey bars on the tail are distinctive to the black hawk-eagle, as is the white line seen slightly above the bird's eye. While flying, the broadness and shortness of the wings become apparent. While in flight, the bird's tail is typically kept closed.

== Diet ==
Though light and small compared to other eagles, this bird is a powerful predator that frequently hunts relatively large prey. It mainly eats large rodents (such as lowland pacas,squirrels), opossums and monkeys (such as howler monkeys, marmosets and squirrel monkeys), as well as, occasionally, bats, birds (even as small as the social flycatcher and passerine nestlings) and some reptiles (such as large lizards, including iguanas, and snakes). Its popular name in Brazil is "Gavião-pega-macaco", which means "hawk catching-monkey". The birds it takes can be quite large, such as toucans, macaws, guans and chachalacas.

== Behavior ==
The black hawk-eagle is a solitary bird who only ever encounter each other during a territory feud or during mating season. When they hunt down prey they look briefly atop perches for anything and if they don't find anything they fly to another perch. Upon finding prey they are taken by pouncing or tail-chasing.

== Breeding ==
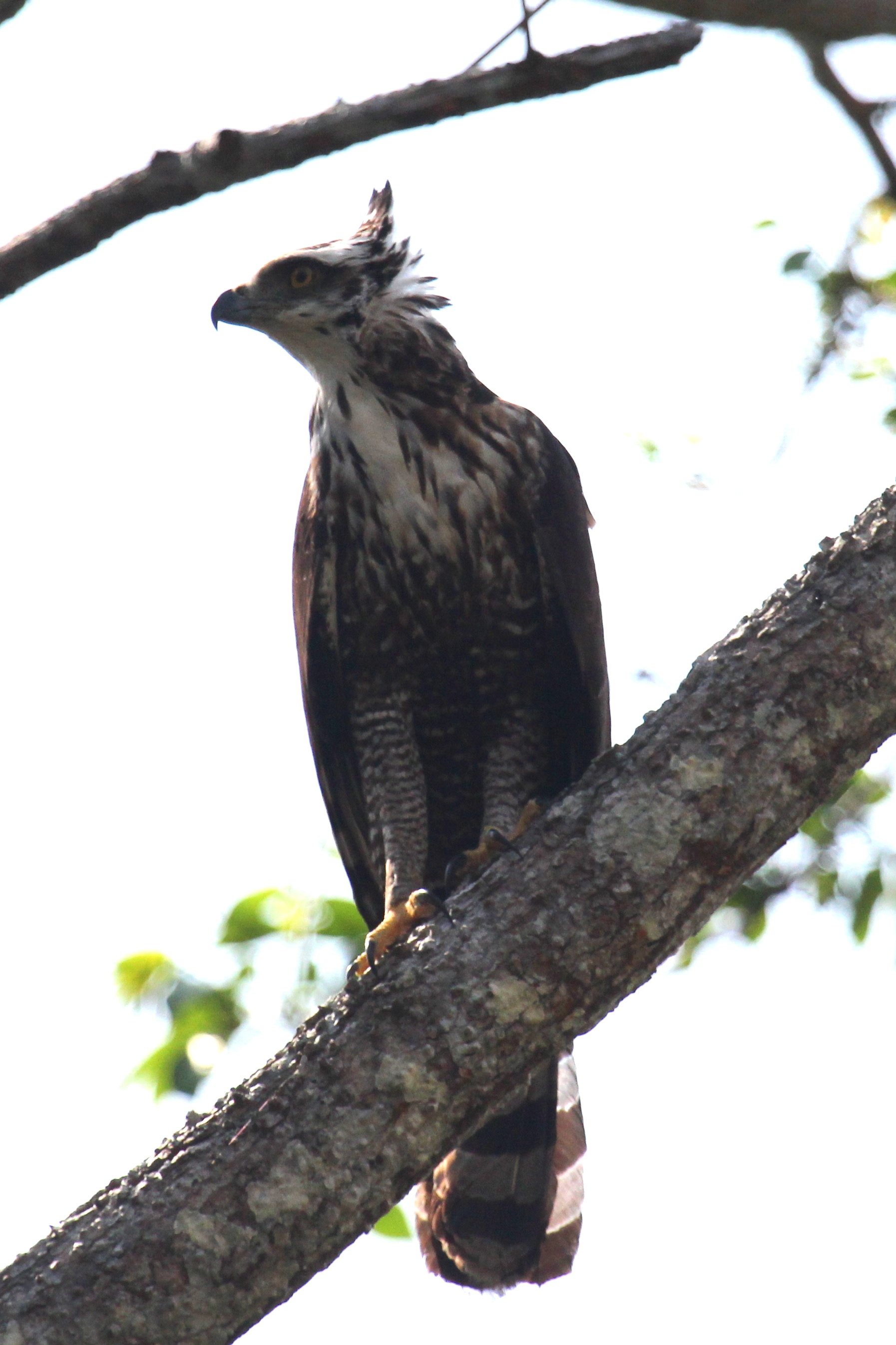
Wild juvenile black hawk-eagle.

The black hawk-eagle's breeding behaviour is little known. In a study carried out in Guatemala by The Peregrine Fund, four nests were documented. The average nest height was 25.5m and the nests were all built in lateral limbs away from the center of the tree. All known breeding pairs, both in the wild and in captivity, have laid single egg clutches and the estimating incubation period is 44 days. During one study it was found that Black hawk-eagles have been noted to lay more during heavy rainfall.
