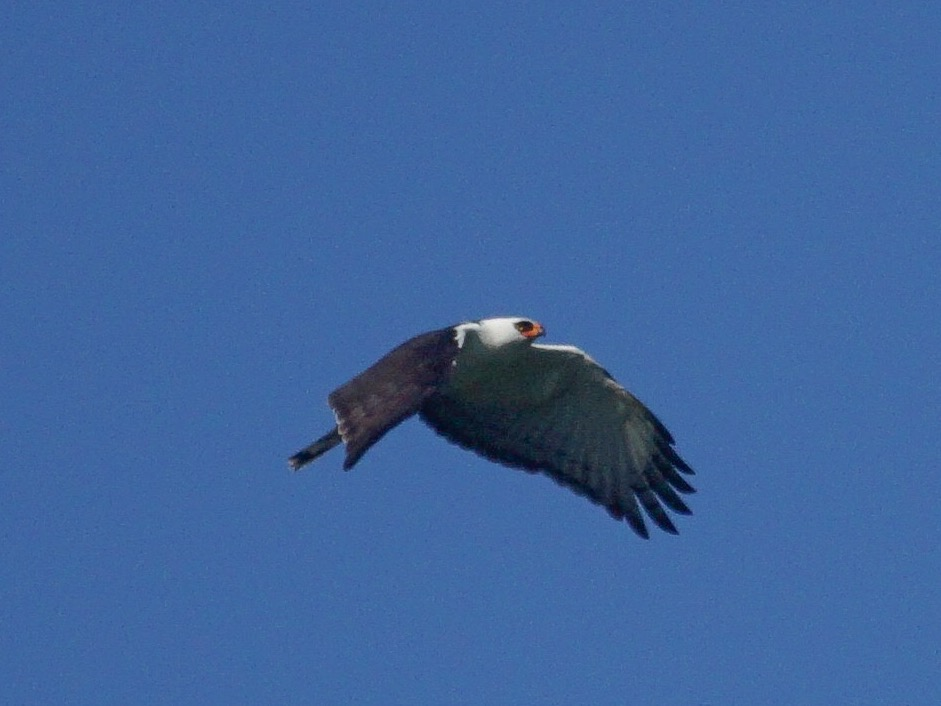

Conservation status
- Least Concern (IUCN 3.1)

Scientific classification
- Kingdom: Animalia
- Phylum: Chordata
- Class: Aves
- Order: Accipitriformes
- Family: Accipitridae
- Genus: Spizaetus
- Species: S. melanoleucus

Binomial name
- Spizaetus melanoleucus (Vieillot, 1816)

Synonyms
- Buteo melanoleucus Vieillot, 1816; Spizastur melanoleucus (Vieillot, 1816)

= Black-and-white hawk-eagle =

Species of bird

The black-and-white hawk-eagle (Spizaetus melanoleucus) is a bird of prey species in the eagle and hawk family (Accipitridae). It is found throughout a large part of tropical America, from southern Mexico to northern Argentina.

== Description ==
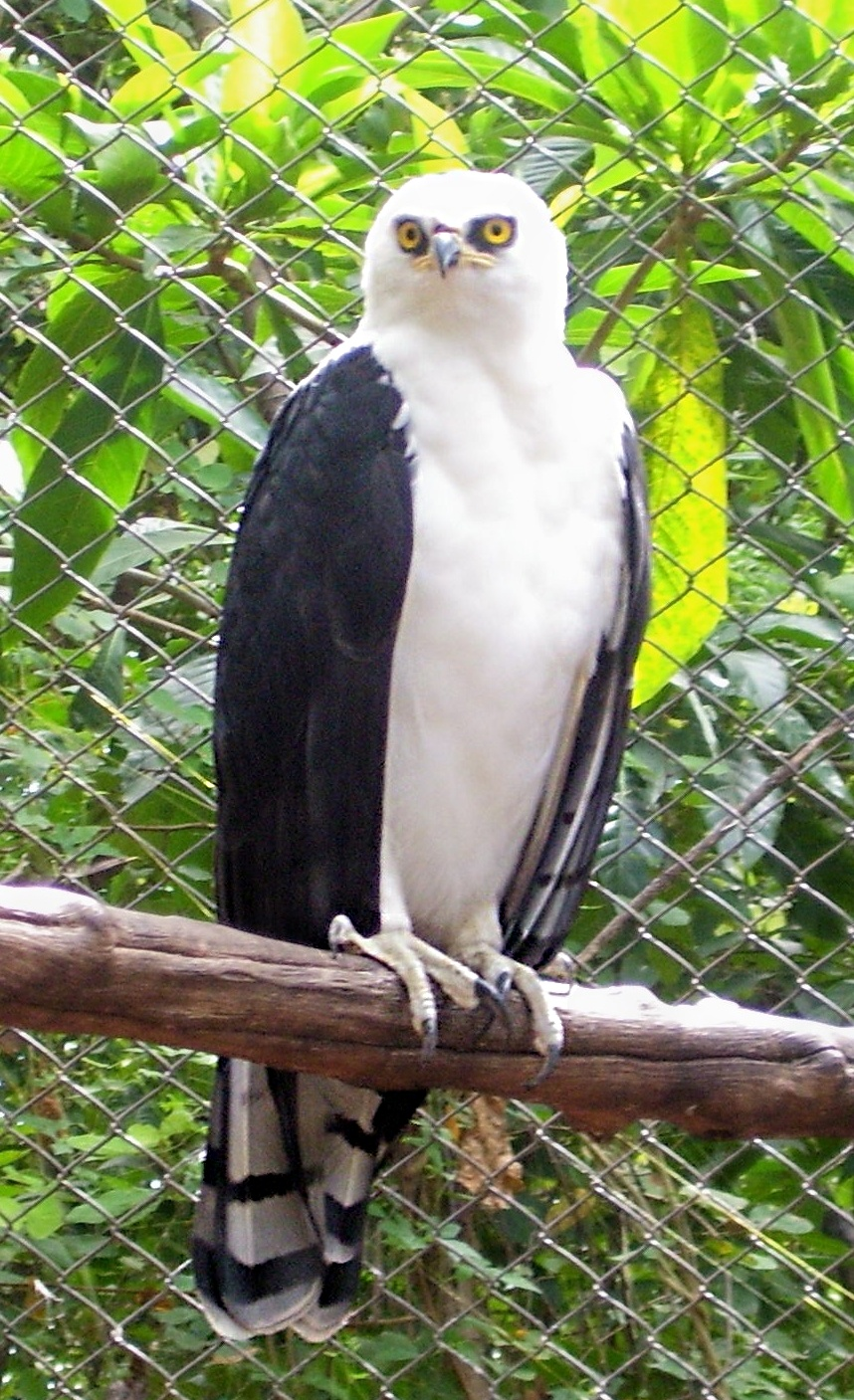
A Black-and-white hawk-eagle in captivity.

As its name suggests, this is a black and white eagle, resembling the small typical eagles sometimes separated in "Hieraaetus". It is some 20–24 in (51–61 cm) long overall and weighs about 30 oz (850 g). The head, neck and body are white; a small crest forms a black spot on top of the head, and the area around the eyes, particularly towards the bill, is also black. The wings are black with a noticeable white leading edge, and the bird has a brownish tail barred black-dark grey and with white tip. The iris is orange in adults and greyish in juveniles, the feet pale to bright yellow with black talons. The bill is black with a yellow cere.

The sexes are alike in color, but the female is larger. Immature birds have pale edges on the upper wing coverts and some brownish-grey feathers on the back.

The black-and-white hawk-eagle is hard to confuse with any other bird in its range with the exception of juvenile Grey-headed Kites. These birds are known to mimic several species of hawk-eagles. The black-faced hawk (Leucopternis melanops) is very similar in overall coloration, but it is much smaller and has a black tail with a single bold white bar in the middle. The ornate hawk-eagle (Spizaetus ornatus), presumably a very close relative of S. melanoleucus, looks quite similar when young. However, the wings, back and tail are much lighter in young S. ornatus, and they do not have the black eye-ring.

== Distribution and ecology ==
This species occurs from Oaxaca to Veracruz in southern Mexico southwards throughout Central America, with the exception of most of El Salvador and the Pacific coast of Nicaragua. In South America, it occurs on the Pacific side of the Andes south to Ecuador. The bulk of its range extends along the Caribbean coast from northern Colombia and Venezuela to the Guianas, and south through eastern Brazil, Paraguay and Uruguay to NE Argentina, and from there westwards again to Beni and Santa Cruz in NE Bolivia. A black-and-white hawk-eagle population is also found in the Loreto Region of NE Peru; it is not known in how far this is isolated from the rest of the bird's range. The species is absent from the western Amazon basin, and even though it might not common in the lands to the east (e.g. in Minas Gerais), there has been at least one nest described in the region.

Its natural habitats are lowland forests of any type, though very dense and humid as well as savanna-like semiarid habitat are not preferred. Habitat fragmentation is not very well tolerated; though the species prefers a diverse habitat of mixed forest and shrubland, it requires large stands of closed-canopy forest to thrive. Its range does not extend very far into the uplands, but one individual was sighted at an altitude of about 4,000 ft (1,200 m) ASL in the Buena Vista Nature Reserve in Colombia's Sierra Nevada de Santa Marta. Another individual was sighted August 7, 2025 at an altitude of about 7,200 ft (2,200 m) ASL in the Bellavista Cloud Forest Reserve in Ecuador's Tandayapa Valley with birding guides Juan-Carlos Crespo and JT Birds.

The food of this carnivore consists of mammals, toads, squamates, and in particular a wide variety of birds. Among the latter, it is known to prefer tree-living species, such as oropendolas, aracaris, tanagers and cotingas. But ground- and waterbirds like tinamous, chachalacas, wood quails, cormorants, and the highly threatened Brazilian merganser (Mergus octosetaceus) have also been recorded as its prey. The black-and-white hawk-eagle has been known to attack small monkeys, and there is one report of it preying on a Rylands' bald-faced saki (Pithecia rylandsi). More significant mammal prey may be opossums.

Its preferred hunting technique is to soar high until it has spotted suitable prey, and then dive down on it, usually right into the forest canopy, but it has also been observed to catch a white woodpecker (Melanerpes candidus) that had been mobbing it in mid-air, after launching itself from its perch. It likes to hunt along ridges and forest edges where it can access the canopy-level from an oblique direction rather than just from directly above, and where ground-living prey is also more accessible.

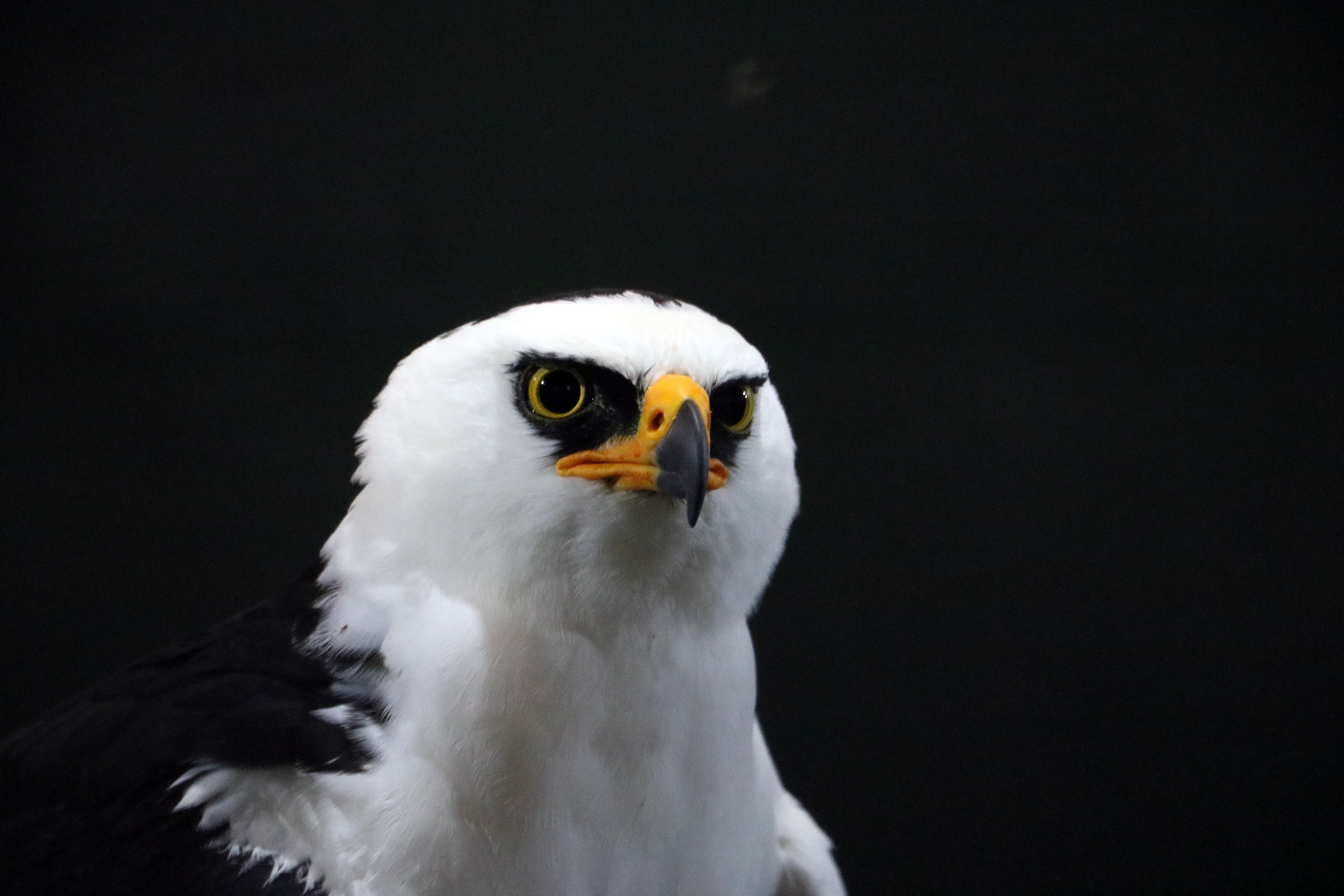
A rescued animal, photo taken in captivity in Argentina

It nests in the forest canopy, building a stick nest high up in exposed trees on ridges and similar locations, from where good hunting grounds can be watched. Detailed observations on its nesting habits are scarce. In Brazil, researchers found and described a nest in 2006 in Southeast Brazil, and in 2009 researchers found and studied two nests in Belize. In Panama, birds started to construct a nest in September, during a dry spell in the rainy season. But the main nesting season may start before the onset of the rainy season as the nesting attempt was abandoned when heavy rains recommenced. The scant other data agrees with this, and at least in Central America the nesting season seems to run from March to June or so.

There is a general lack of information on the black-and-white hawk-eagle's movements and population status. Each bird seems to require a hunting territory of about 3,500 acres (1,400 hectares) at least. While the variety of habitat types in which it is found suggests that it is not particularly susceptible to changes in land use, it is apparently still a rare and local species almost anywhere in its range. The IUCN until 2000 classified it as a Near Threatened species due to the uncertainties surrounding its status, but as no evidence of a marked decline has been found and as the bird is found across a wide range, it was downlisted to a Species of Least Concern.

== Taxonomy and systematics ==
This species is often placed in the monotypic genus Spizastur, but has recently been moved to Spizaetus e.g. by the American Ornithologists' Union, as it appears that the ornate hawk-eagle (S. ornatus) is its sister taxon. This has created quite some taxonomic confusion, which has largely gone unnoticed however:

Originally, the name Spizaetus melanoleucus was given by Louis Pierre Vieillot to the black-chested buzzard-eagle in 1819, while the black-and-white hawk-eagle had been described in 1816 by the very same scientist as Buteo melanoleucus. The former species was placed in Geranoaetus – also a monotypic genus – in 1844, while the black-and-white hawk-eagle had been moved out of Buteo and into Spizastur a few years earlier.

Thus, the identical specific epithets never came into direct conflict until recently. But the black-chested eagle-buzzard's placement in a monotypic genus was always disputed, and several authors treated it in Buteo. However, they overlooked that Buteo melanoleucus was the original name of the black-and-white hawk-eagle and thus as a senior homonym could not be applied to the later-described species. The correct specific name for the black-chested eagle-buzzard when placed in Buteo, Buteo fuscescens, was reestablished in the mid-20th century for a short time more by accident than anything else; as most late-20th-century researchers argued for retaining Geranoaetus, this name was dismissed as erroneous and essentially forgotten.

As the black-and-white hawk-eagle has not been placed in Buteo since long, Article 59.3 of the ICZN Code applies. According to this, a junior homonym replaced before 1961 is not rendered permanently invalid (as junior homonyms usually are) if "the substitute name is not in use" – which has been the case after Amadon's 1963 revision. Hence, in this case the scientific name Buteo melanoleucus can apply to the black-chested eagle-buzzard, even though the black-and-white hawk-eagle was described under exactly that name earlier, while the senior homonym melanoleucus still applies to the latter species when placed in Spizaetus according to the usual ICZN rules. Consequently, the proper name to use for each bird has through a number of coincidences become the senior synonym of the other species.
