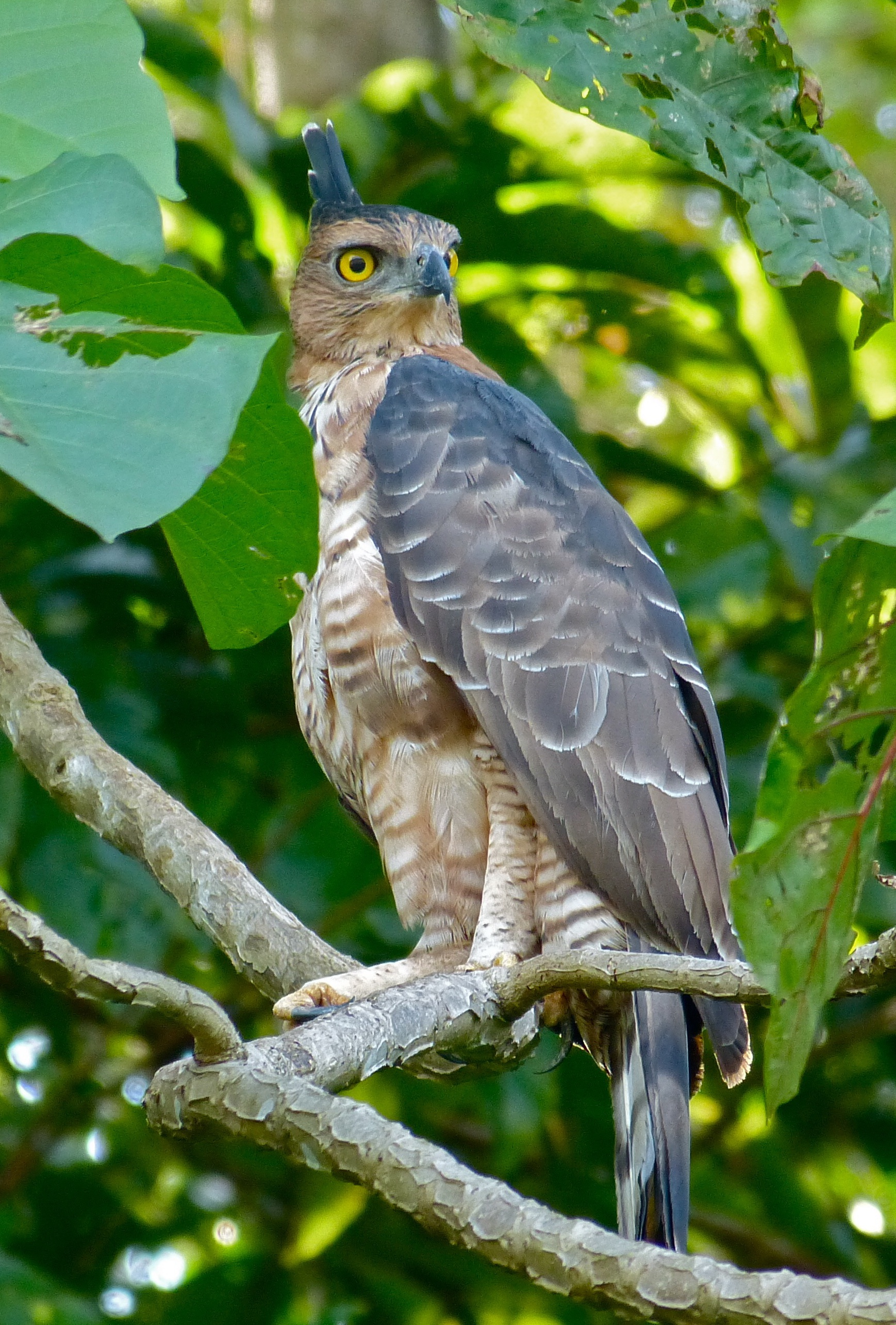

Conservation status
- Vulnerable (IUCN 3.1)

Scientific classification
- Kingdom: Animalia
- Phylum: Chordata
- Class: Aves
- Order: Accipitriformes
- Family: Accipitridae
- Genus: Nisaetus
- Species: N. nanus

Binomial name
- Nisaetus nanus (Wallace, 1868)

Subspecies
- S. cirrhatus and S. nipalensis: N. n. nanus - (Wallace, 1868); N. n. stresemanni - (Amadon, 1953)

Synonyms
- Spizaetus nanus (protonym)

= Wallace's hawk-eagle =

Species of bird

Wallace's hawk-eagle (Nisaetus nanus) is a species of bird of prey in the family Accipitridae. It is found in Kra Isthmus, Malay Peninsula, Sumatra and Borneo. Its natural habitat is subtropical or tropical moist lowland forests. It is threatened by habitat loss and trade. It is among the smallest eagles in the world at about 46 cm (18 in) long and weighing 500–610 g (1.10–1.34 lb) (about the size of a peregrine falcon).

It is named after Alfred Russel Wallace, a British naturalist, explorer, geographer, anthropologist and biologist.

It is non-migratory.
