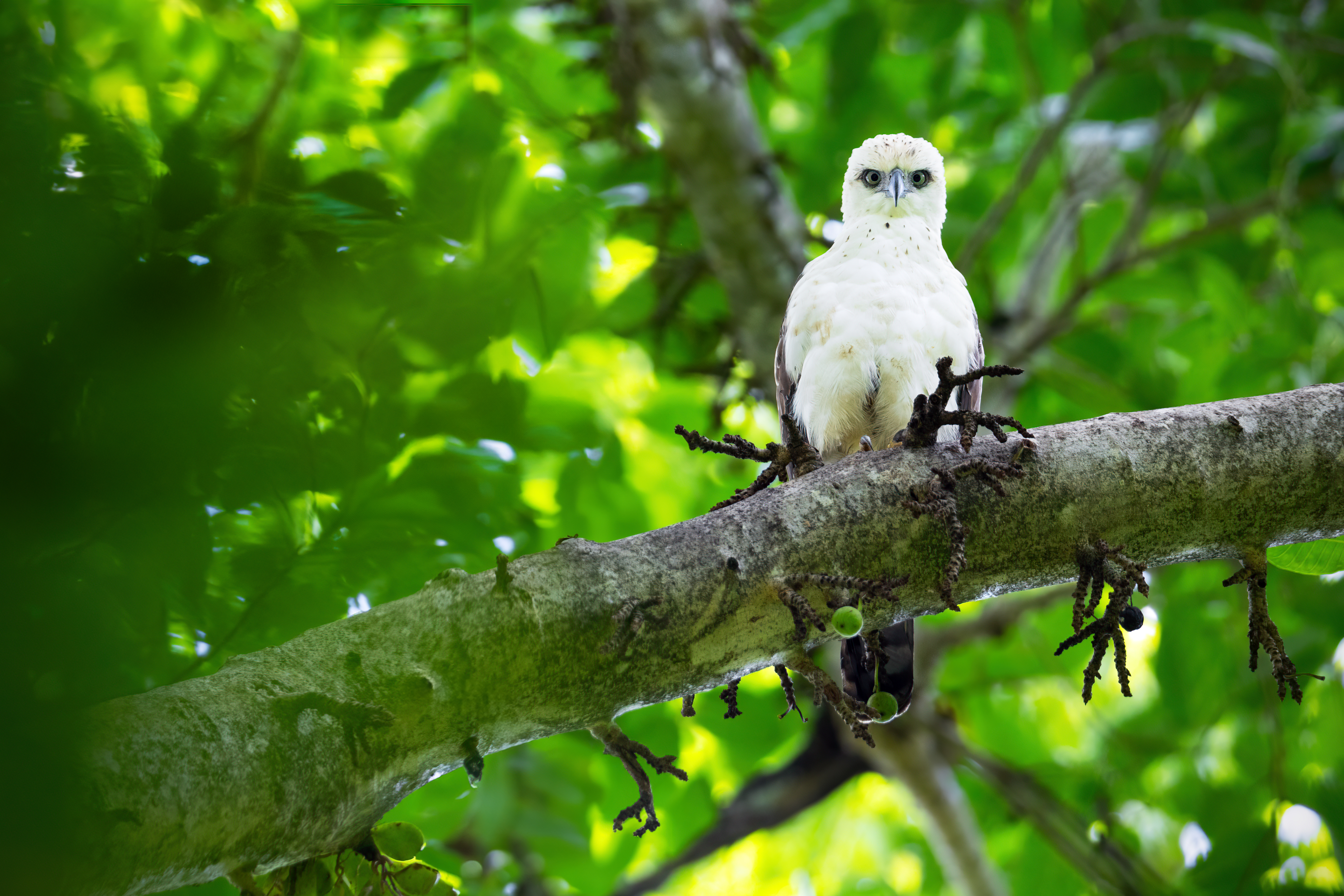
- juvenile

Conservation status
- Least Concern (IUCN 3.1)

Scientific classification
- Kingdom: Animalia
- Phylum: Chordata
- Class: Aves
- Order: Accipitriformes
- Family: Accipitridae
- Genus: Nisaetus
- Species: N. lanceolatus

Binomial name
- Nisaetus lanceolatus (Temminck & Schlegel, 1845)

Synonyms
- Spizaetus lanceolatus

= Sulawesi hawk-eagle =

Species of bird

Sulawesi Hawk-Eagle flying

The Sulawesi hawk-eagle (Nisaetus lanceolatus) (earlier placed under Spizaetus), also known as Celebes hawk-eagle, is a medium-sized, approximately 64 cm (25 in) long, crestless brown raptor in the family Accipitridae. The adults have rufous-brown, boldly marked head and chest feathers, dark brown wings and black-barred white below. The young has white head and underparts.

An Indonesian endemic, the Sulawesi hawk-eagle is distributed in rainforests of Sulawesi and its satellite islands of Buton, Muna, Banggai and Sula Islands. The diet consists mainly of birds, lizards, snakes and mammals.

Widespread throughout its habitat range, the Sulawesi hawk-eagle is evaluated as Least Concern on the IUCN Red List of Threatened Species. It is listed on Appendix II of CITES.
