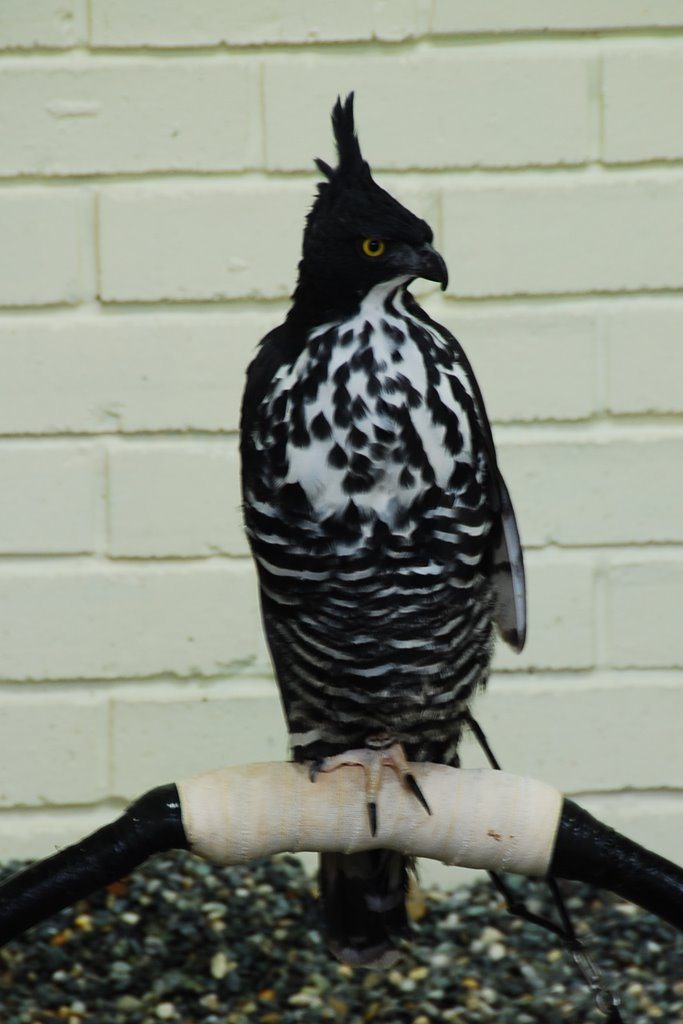
- At Jurong Bird Park, Singapore

Conservation status
- Least Concern (IUCN 3.1)

Scientific classification
- Kingdom: Animalia
- Phylum: Chordata
- Class: Aves
- Order: Accipitriformes
- Family: Accipitridae
- Genus: Nisaetus
- Species: N. alboniger

Binomial name
- Nisaetus alboniger Blyth, 1845

Synonyms
- Spizaetus alboniger

= Blyth's hawk-eagle =

Species of bird

Blyth's hawk-eagle (Nisaetus alboniger) (earlier treated as Spizaetus) is a medium-sized bird of prey. Like all eagles, it is in the family Accipitridae.

It can be found in the Malay Peninsula, Singapore, Sumatra and Borneo. It is a bird of open woodland, although island forms prefer a higher tree density. It builds a stick nest in a tree and lays a single egg.

It is a fairly small eagle at about 50–60 cm (20–24 in) in length. The adult has a thick white band on uppertail and undertail, all black above, black spotted breast, barred below. It has a prominent crest like the bazas. Juvenile is dark brown above, and has a light brown head and underparts.

The common name commemorates Edward Blyth (1810–1873), English zoologist and Curator of the Museum of the Asiatic Society of Bengal.

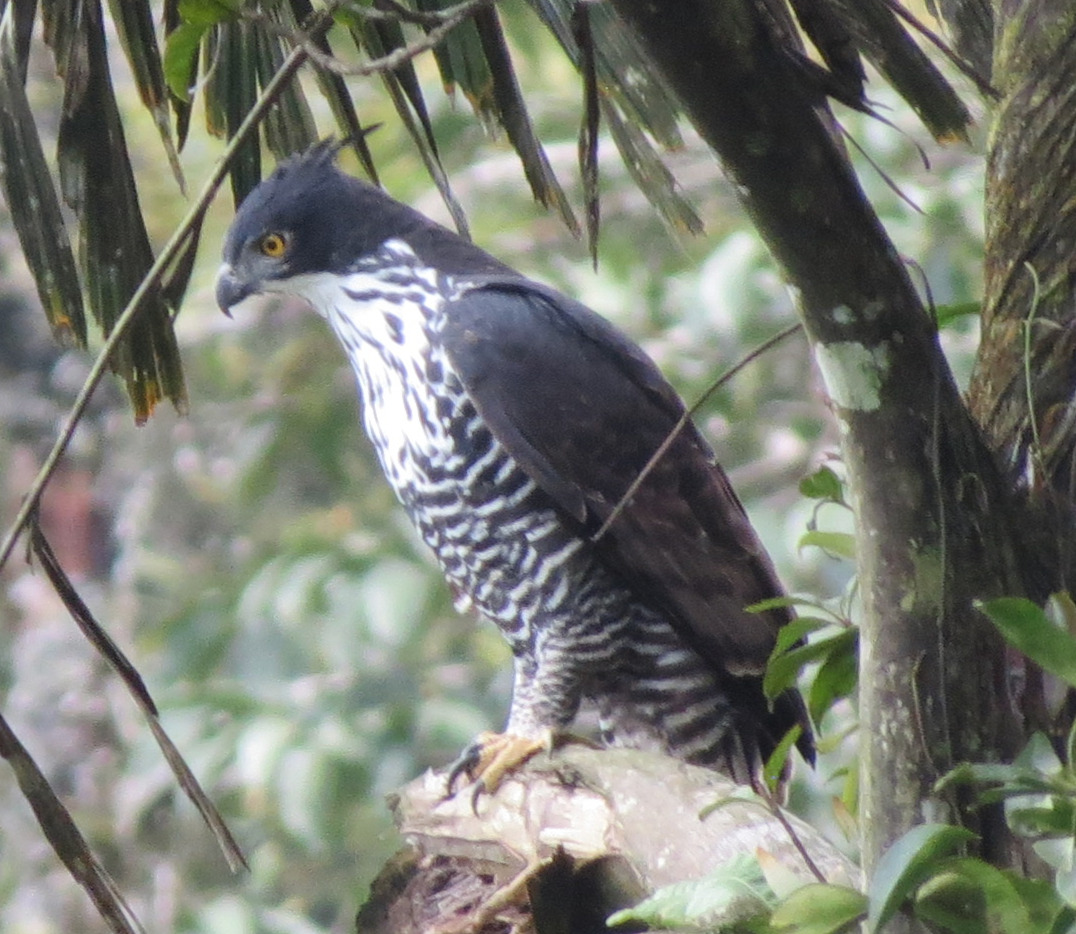
Blythe's hawk-eagle in Peninsular Malaysia
