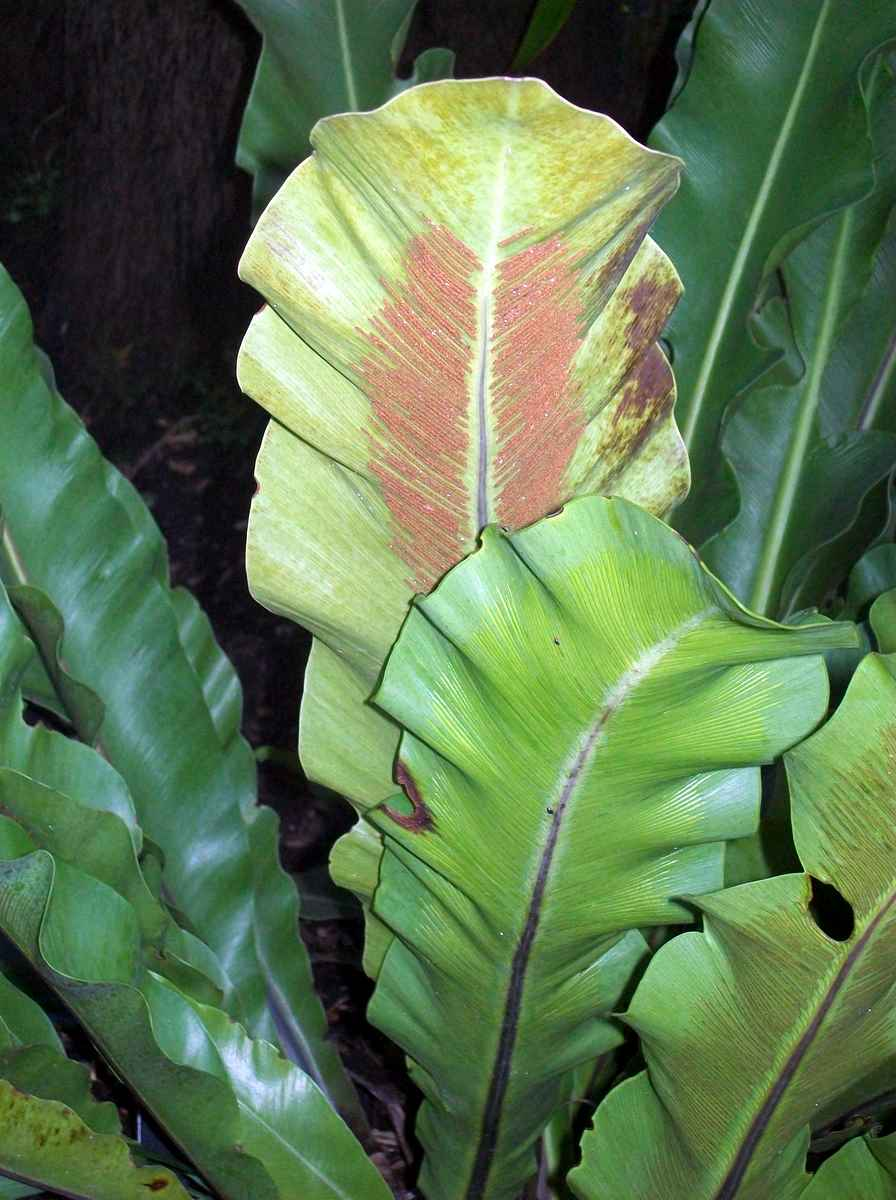

Scientific classification
- Kingdom: Plantae
- Clade: Tracheophytes
- Division: Polypodiophyta
- Class: Polypodiopsida
- Order: Polypodiales
- Suborder: Aspleniineae
- Family: Aspleniaceae
- Genus: Asplenium
- Species: A. goudeyi

Binomial name
- Asplenium goudeyi D.L.Jones

= Asplenium goudeyi =

Species of fern in the spleenwort family

Asplenium goudeyi is a fern only found on Lord Howe Island. A common plant growing in a variety of situations. On trees, or rocks, boulders, cliff faces and sometimes in exposed positions. The wavy edged fronds are 50 to 75 cm (20 to 30 in) long, and 12 to 18 cm (4.7 to 7.1 in) wide.

== Taxonomy ==
This plant was described in 1996.

A global phylogeny of Asplenium published in 2020 divided the genus into eleven clades, which were given informal names pending further taxonomic study. A. goudeyi belongs to the "Neottopteris clade", members of which generally have somewhat leathery leaf tissue. While the subclades of this group are poorly resolved, several of them share a characteristic "bird's-nest fern" morphology with entire leaves and fused veins near the margin. A. goudeyi forms a clade with the morphologically similar A. nidus sensu lato and A. australasicum, but other bird's-nest ferns such as A. antiquum and A. phyllitidis form a separate subclade which is not particularly closely related.
