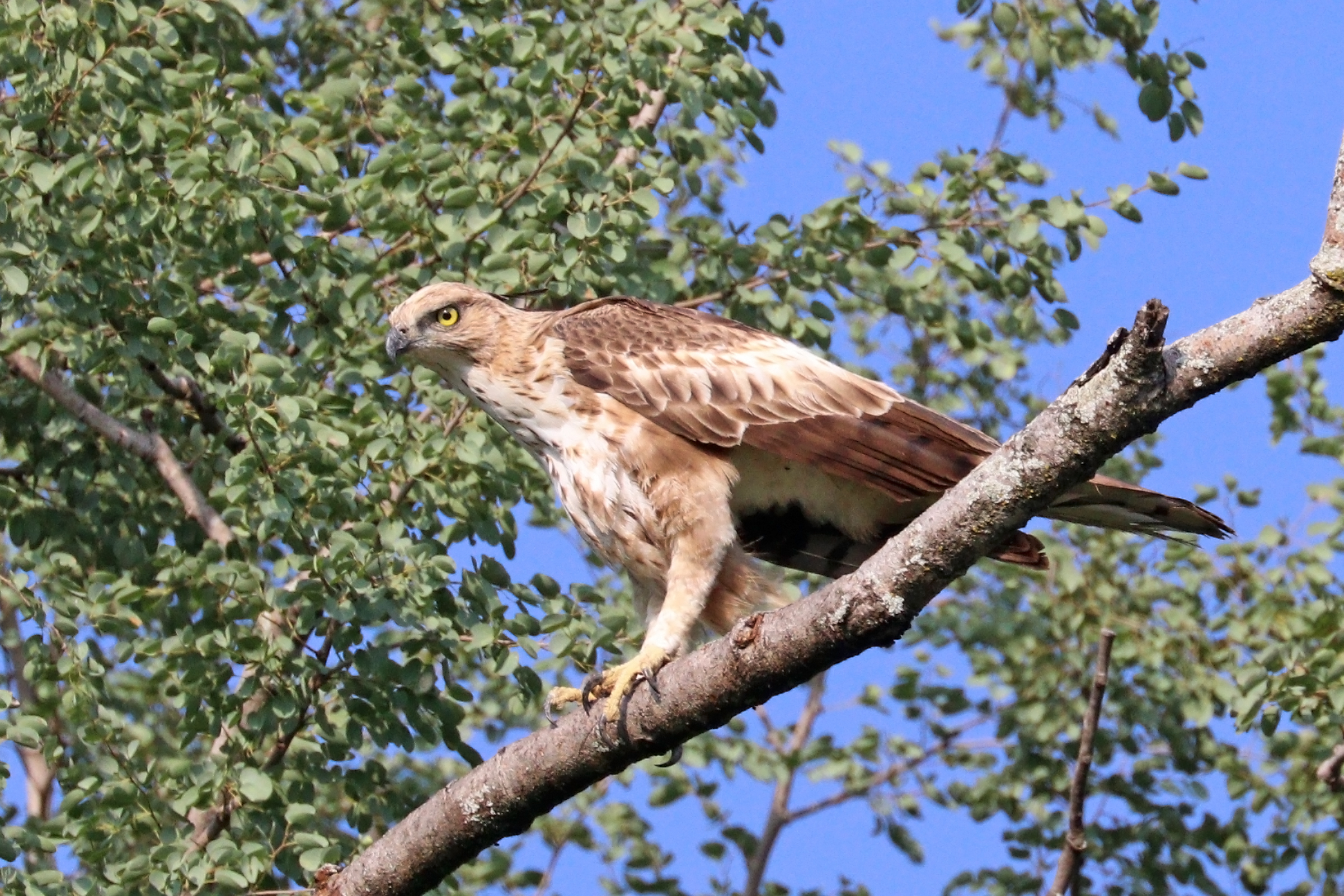
- at Chinnar Wildlife Sanctuary, Kerala

Conservation status
- Least Concern (IUCN 3.1)

Scientific classification
- Kingdom: Animalia
- Phylum: Chordata
- Class: Aves
- Order: Accipitriformes
- Family: Accipitridae
- Genus: Nisaetus
- Species: N. cirrhatus

Binomial name
- Nisaetus cirrhatus (Gmelin, JF, 1788)

Subspecies
- N. c. limnaeetus - (Horsfield, 1821); N. c. cirrhatus - (Gmelin, JF, 1788); N. c. ceylanensis - (Gmelin, JF, 1788); N. c. andamanensis - (Tytler, 1865); N. c. vanheurni - (Junge, 1936)

Synonyms
- Spizaetus cirrhatus

= Changeable hawk-eagle =

Species of bird native to Asia

The changeable hawk-eagle (Nisaetus cirrhatus) or crested hawk-eagle is a large bird of prey species of the family Accipitridae. More informal or antiquated English common names include the marsh hawk-eagle or Indian crested hawk-eagle. It is a member of the subfamily Aquilinae, with signature feathers, absent in tropical raptors from outside this subfamily, covering the tarsus. It was formerly placed in the genus Spizaetus, but studies pointed to the group being paraphyletic resulting in the Old World members being placed in Nisaetus and separated from the New World species. It is a typical "hawk-eagle" in that it is an agile forest-dwelling predator and like many such eagles readily varies its prey selection between birds, mammals or reptiles as well as other vertebrates. Among the members of its genus, the changeable hawk-eagle stands out as the most widely distributed, adaptable and abundant species. Individuals show a wide range of variation in plumage from pale to dark, varying with moult and age giving rise to the name "changeable".

== Taxonomy ==
The changeable hawk-eagle was formally described in 1788 by the German naturalist Johann Friedrich Gmelin in his revised and expanded edition of Carl Linnaeus's Systema Naturae. He placed it with the eagles, hawks and relatives in the genus Falco and coined the binomial name Falco cirrhatus. Gmelin's description was based on the "crested Indian falcon" or the Falco Indicus cirratus that had been first described in 1676 by the English naturalists Francis Willughby and John Ray from a live bird kept in the Royal Aviary in St James's Park, London. The changeable hawk-eagle was formerly placed in the genus Spizaetus but it and nine other Old World hawk-eagles were moved to the resurrected genus Nisaetus following the publication in 2005 and 2007 of two molecular phylogentic studies. The genus Nisaetus had been introduced in 1836 by the English naturalist Brian Houghton Hodgson. The genus name Nisaetus combines the Medieval Latin nisus for a sparrowhawk with the Ancient Greek aetos meaning "eagle". The specific epithet cirrhatus is from Latin cirratus meaning "curly-headed".

The taxonomy of the wide-ranging changeable hawk-eagle is complex and confusing, with few authorities agreeing on whether the species in fact houses a species complex. Gamauf et al. (2005) analyzed mtDNA cytochrome b and control region sequence data of a considerable number of specimens of the crested hawk-eagle and some relatives. Despite the large sample, even the most conspicuous dichotomy - that between the crested and crestless groups - was not as well resolved as it might have been expected to be. At least one widely accepted genetic study has resulted in a recent revision to the recognition of a new species, as the Flores hawk-eagle has traditionally been treated as a subspecies of the changeable hawk-eagle, but it is now often treated as a separate species, N. floris. The Flores and changeable hawk-eagles are regarded as sister species. The three small-island taxa (N. c. andamanensis, N. c. vanheurni, and N. floris) as a whole each appear as monophyletic lineages. Their placement is even more unresolved, with N. floris being apparently a very ancient lineage. The other two seem quite certainly to derive from N. c. limnaeetus. The latter taxon has a confusing phylogeny. Different lineages exist that are apparently not stable in space and time, are best described as polytomy, from which the similar island taxa derive. Obviously, N. c. limnaeetus does not represent a monophyletic lineage. Neither the biological nor the phylogenetic species concepts, nor phylogenetic systematics can be applied to satisfaction. The crested group apparently is close to becoming a distinct species. The island taxa derived from N. c. limnaeetus appear to have undergone founder effects, which has restricted their genetic diversity. In the continental population, genetic diversity is considerable, and the evolutionary pattern of the two studied genes did not agree, and neither did the origin of specimens show clear structures. N. c. limnaeetus thus is best considered a metapopulation.

Gamauf et al. (2005) therefore suggest the island taxa which are obviously at higher risk of extinction are, for conservation considered evolutionary significant units regardless of their systematic status. This case also demonstrates that a too-rigid interpretation of cladistics and the desire for monophyletic taxa, as well as universal application of single-species concept to all birds will undermine correct understanding of evolutionary relationships. It would even not be inconceivable to find mainland lineages to group closely with the western island taxa, if little genetic drift had occurred in the initial population. nonetheless, the divergence of this species' lineages seems to have taken place too recently to award them species status, as compared to the level of genetic divergence at which clades are usually considered distinct species. N. c. limnaeetus appears for all that can be said with reasonable certainty basal pool of lineages in the crestless group that, despite not being monophyletic, should be considered a valid taxon as long as gene flow is possible through its range. In addition, as ancient DNA from museum specimens was used extensively, the possibility of ghost lineages must be considered. If it is assumed that all or most of the ancient lineages still exist today, considerable recombination must have taken place as the two genes' phylogenies do not agree much, indicating a healthy level of gene flow. Whether this still holds true today remains to be determined.

Two distinct groups exist in the changeable hawk-eagle; one with crests and one without or with hardly visible crests. A 2020 study found that the reproductive isolation between the two groups was weak and recommended treating the two groups as conspecific. Dark morphs exist for some populations.

=== Subspecies ===
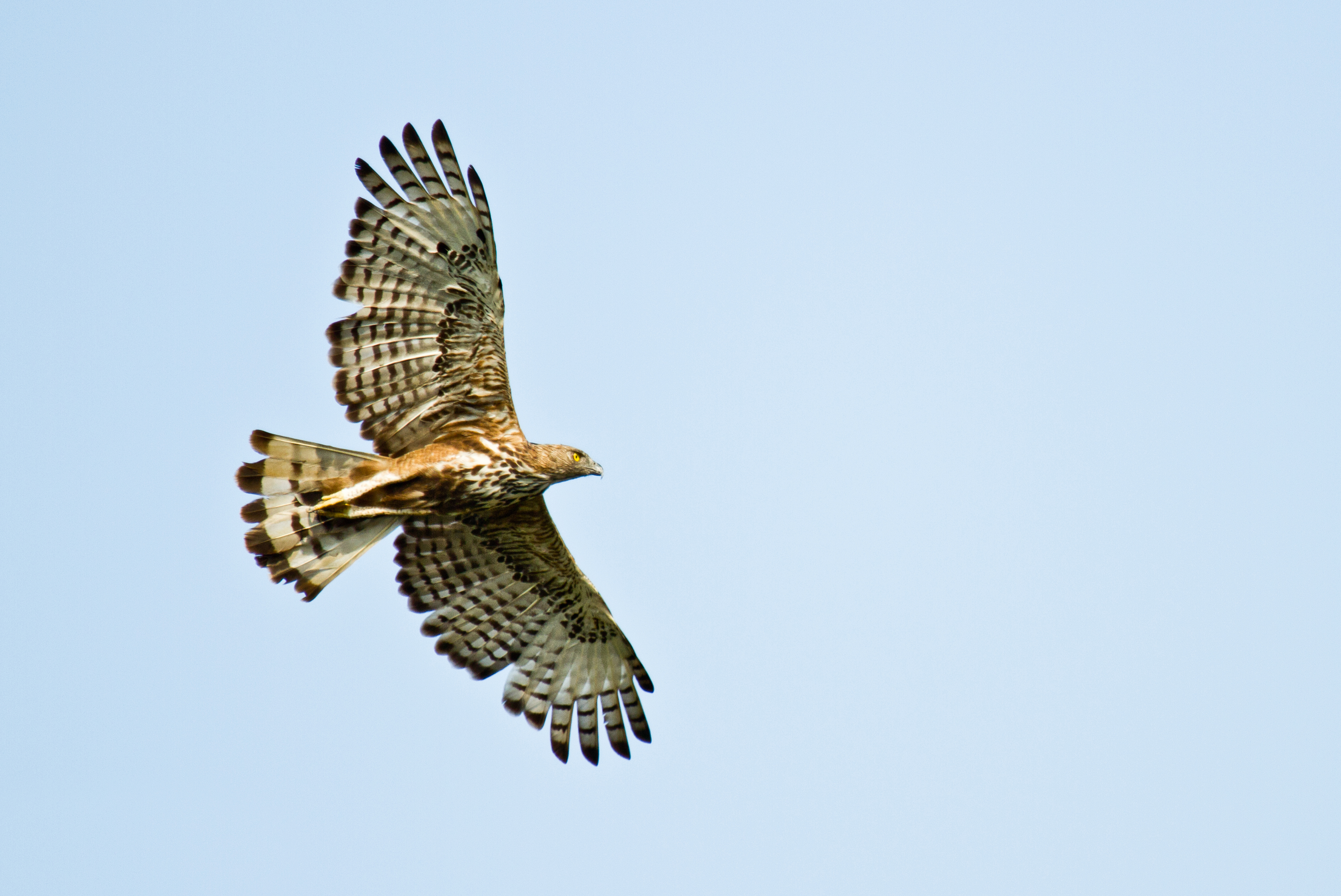
In flight, changeable hawk-eagles have distinctly short but broad wings with dark barring on flight feathers and a long tail.

Changeable hawk-eagle group

- N. c. cirrhatus (Gmelin, JF, 1788) : The nominate subspecies is found in the peninsular India, from the Gangetic plain southwards throughout the remainder of the country. It is monomorphic in colour with no dark morph. The nominate subspecies is relatively pale above compared to other races, with a slightly more rufous hue to the head. It tends to be less extensively streaked below down to the lower breast below compared to other races, with dark wing lings and a strongly barred tail. In the juvenile plumage, the nominate race has a strongly buffy headed and has underparts that are flecked and spotted. The crest tends to be longest in this race, with common measurements of 10 to 14 cm (3.9 to 5.5 in) in length, therefore the race is commonly referred to as the crested hawk-eagle. It is one of the two larger subspecies. Wing chord length ranges from 405 to 442 mm (15.9 to 17.4 in) in males and from 448 to 462 mm (17.6 to 18.2 in) in females. In both sexes, the tail commonly measures 280 to 300 mm (11 to 12 in) and tarsus from 102 to 110 mm (4.0 to 4.3 in).
- N. c. ceylanensis (Gmelin, JF, 1788): This race is endemic to Sri Lanka but some authorities also include Travancore in the southern tip of India as part of this race's range. This race has a proportionally longer crest on average than the nominate race, with a similar crest length to it at about 10 cm (3.9 in). It is monomorphic as is the nominate race, averaging paler and less streaky, but a similar appearance has been noted to birds from southernmost India are rather similar in appearance. The differences represented in this race from the nominate race are largely clinal. It is rather smaller than the nominate race. Wing chord length ranges from 351 to 370 mm (13.8 to 14.6 in) in males and from 353 to 387 mm (13.9 to 15.2 in) in females. Furthermore, in both sexes tail length is from 229 to 266 mm (9.0 to 10.5 in) and tarsus length from 89 to 97 mm (3.5 to 3.8 in).

Crestless changeable hawk-eagle group

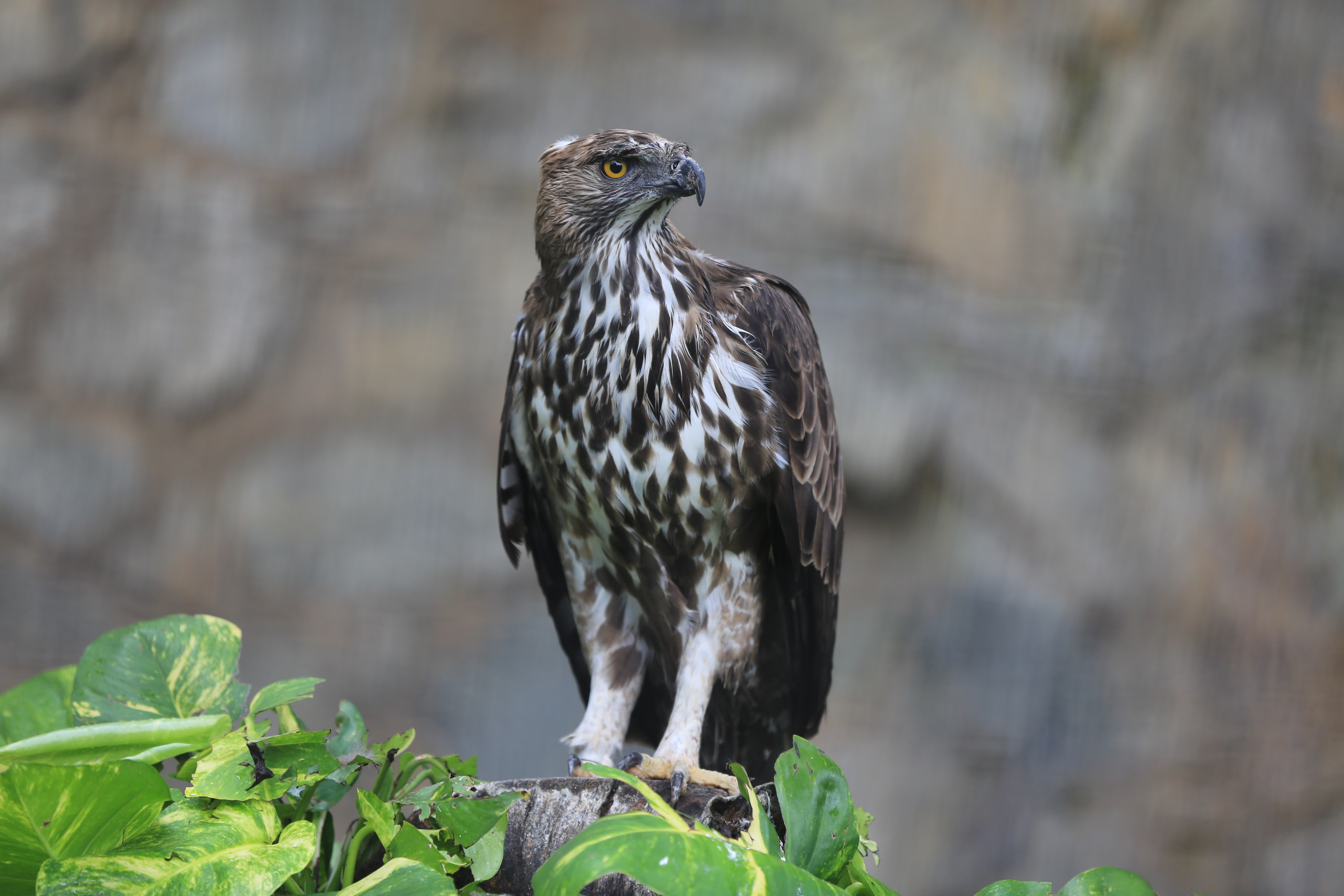
A crestless changeable hawk-eagle (N. c. limnaeetus) in Singapore.

- N. c. limnaeetus (Horsfield, 1821): This race is found through the Himalayan foothills from Nepal, northeast India, via Burma to much of southeast Asia including the Malay Peninsula along Wallace Line to Philippines and the Greater Sunda Islands. This race can appear similar in size and build to the nominate race but unlike it is rather polymorphic and this is the most widely found of subspecies. This race's polymorphism is the source for the species being referred to as the changeable hawk-eagle. The pale morph of this race is still darker than the nominate race found further south in India. However, pale morphs from the Philippines tend to have a paler head and neck. Characteristically, this race is heavily streaked below, while juveniles look quite different as their head and underparts are largely white. Dark morph individuals tend to be chocolate-brown all over, although the tail base might appear lighter in flight. Some birds of this race do have a vestigial crest of merely 1 to 3 cm (0.39 to 1.18 in) in length but many appear to completely lack the crest. This race is generally similar in size to the nominate race but is more variable in size over its large distribution within the southernmost island birds averaging smallest while those found in the Himalayan foothills are arguably the largest hawk-eagles known in the species. Wing chord length ranges from 380 to 430 mm (15 to 17 in) in males and from 405 to 462 mm (15.9 to 18.2 in) in females. In limited samples, tail length was reported as 240 to 278 mm (9.4 to 10.9 in) and tarsus length from 100 to 103 mm (3.9 to 4.1 in). A sample of 6 females averaged 37.9 mm (1.49 in) in the length of the rear hallux-claw, the main killing apparatus of most accipitrids, while 7 males averaged 32.3 mm (1.27 in).
- N. c. andamanensis (Tytler, 1865): This race is found in the Andaman Islands. The subspecies is darker than the nominate subspecies and more similar to N. c. limnaeetus in hue but does not appear to have a full dark morph as is known in that race. Andamanian juveniles tend to have a rather white head and underpart colour. A crest may variably be present but is usually only up to 5 cm (2.0 in). This race is small, a little smaller even than N. c. ceylanensis. Wing chord length ranges from 330 to 375 mm (13.0 to 14.8 in) in males and from 358 to 377 mm (14.1 to 14.8 in) in females.
- N. c. vanheurni (Junge, 1936): This race is native to Simeulue Island. It is similar in appearance to N. c. limnaeetus, but apparently lacks a dark morph. The subspecies is also much less heavily blotched black on its whiter looking breast and never bears a crest. It is the smallest accepted subspecies of the changeable hawk-eagle, considerably smaller than N. c. limnaeetus. Wing chord was measured as 312 mm (12.3 in) in a single male and 329 to 337 mm (13.0 to 13.3 in) in a small sample of females.

== Description ==
The changeable hawk-eagle is a largish but slender eagle. They fall near the middle of sizes among the currently accepted species in the genus Nisaetus. As in most birds of prey, females are larger than males with an average overall size difference of 7% but this can individually range to an 18-22% difference, with island races apparently thought to be less dimorphic on average. Size is quite variable and total length has been reported in the past to vary from 51 to 82 cm (20 to 32 in) and wingspan from 100 to 160 cm (39 to 63 in), however these figures appear to include the much more massive hawk-eagles from Flores that are currently considered their own separate species by modern authorities. Nonetheless, total lengths of up to 77 cm (30 in) have been listed for N. c. limnaeetus in Nepal. Ali & Ripley (1978) estimated these average total lengths for the following subspecies: N. c. cirrhatus at 72 cm (28 in), N. c. limnaeetus at 70 cm (28 in) and N. c. andamanensis at 61 cm (24 in). Legge (1880) measured the length of Sri Lankan changeable hawk-eagles (N. c. ceylanensis) without including the beak as 55 to 60 cm (22 to 24 in). The average length of birds from the Philippines (N. c. limnaeetus) was measured as 58.4 cm (23.0 in) in males and 64.9 cm (25.6 in) in females. Weights in this species have been reported from 1.2 to 1.9 kg (2.6 to 4.2 lb) but the source of this is unclear and it probably underrepresents the size variation known to occur in the species. The only precise body masses known for the species are derived from the Philippine population, where males average 1.36 kg (3.0 lb) and females average 1.6 kg (3.5 lb) but they could weigh in excess of 1.81 kg (4.0 lb).

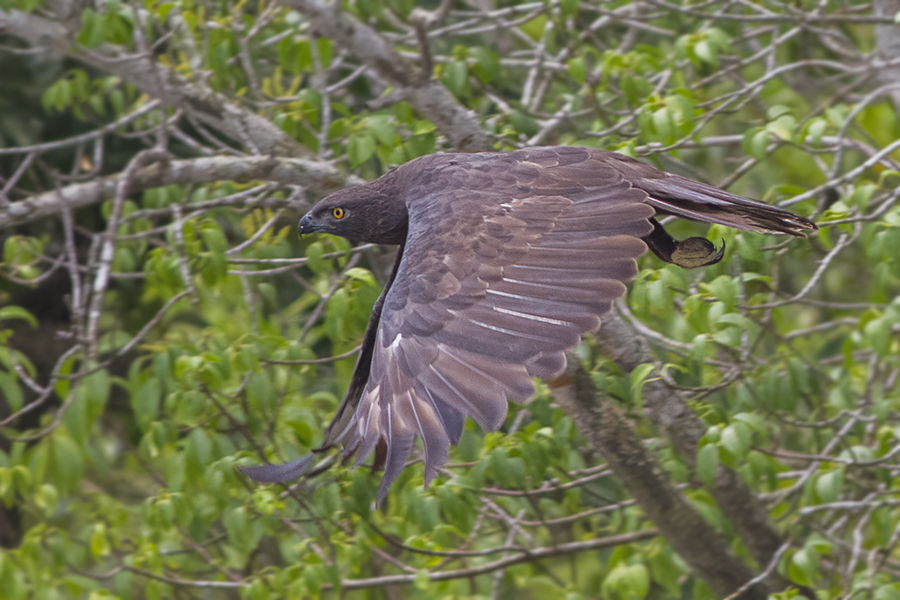
A crestless rare dark morph in flight in Sunderbans National Park

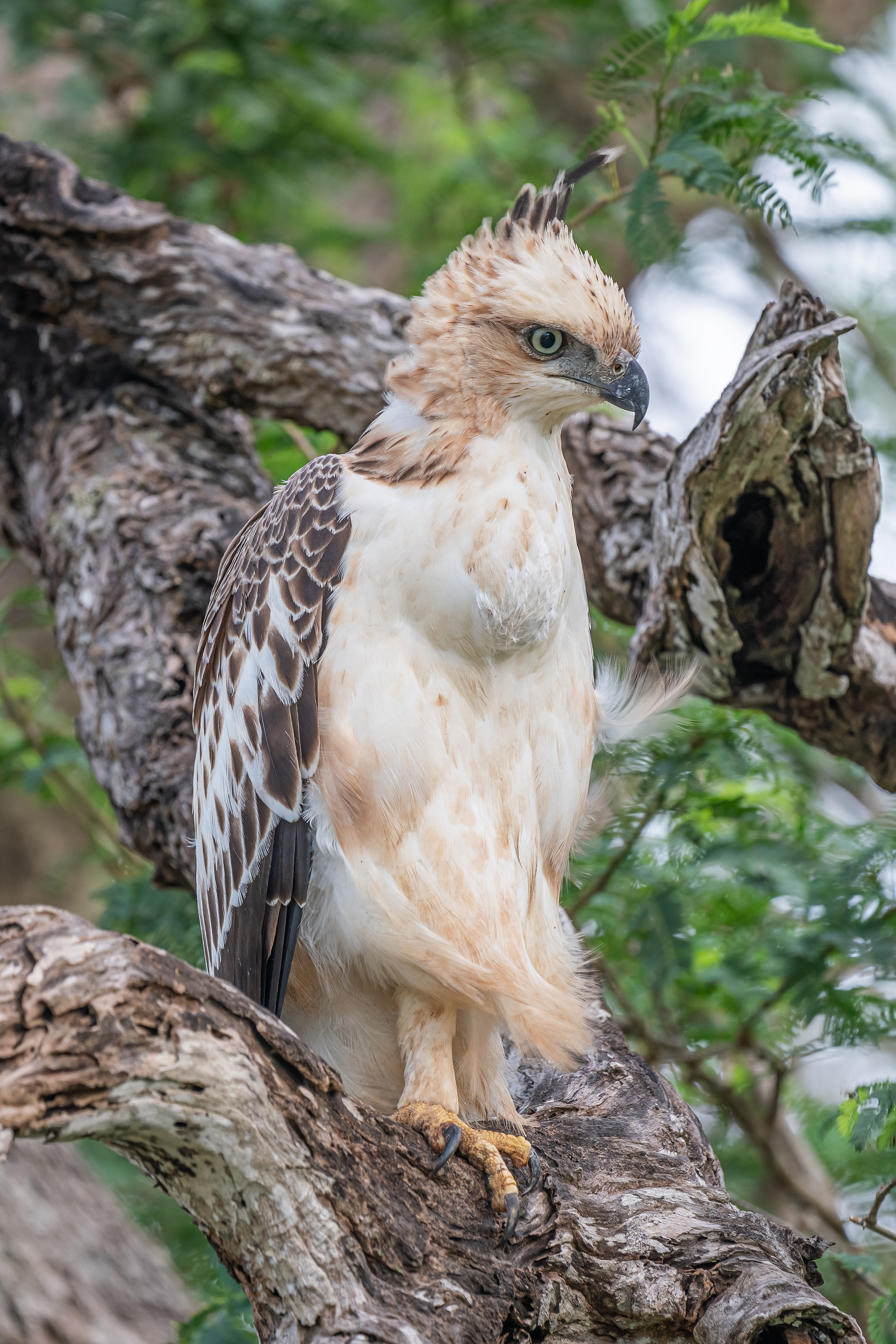
A juvenile in Bundala National Park

Adult changeable hawk-eagles are typically dark brown above and boldly streaked below with a strong bill, a variably sized, often floppy crest or no crest, rather short wings, a quite long, thinly-barred tail and long feathered legs. This species tends to perch bolt upright, and may perch in various places from somewhat secluded spots to also quite open area as well. When perched, their wings reach only about one-third to halfway down tail. Pale morph adults are mainly dark brown above with very faint paler edges that are usually only conspicuous on the wing-coverts. They tend to have an evenly black-streaked and somewhat rufous-tinged head and neck, with a blackish crest (if present). The tail tends to be paler brown than the back with a thin whitish tip, a broad, blackish subterminal band (both the whitish tip and the subterminal band are also visible from tail underside) and 3 to 4 narrower, brown and often rather obscure bars. On the pale morph hawk-eagle's underside, the base colour is white to buff overlaid with bold black to dark brown streaking; the streaking tends to be more subtle on abdomen but more obvious on the legs. Beyond the typical pale morph, some subspecies but especially N. c. liminaeetus tend to have a further intermediate and a dark morph. The intermediate morph is somewhat similar to pale morph adults but is heavily grey-brown below with little to no paler base colour showing and more obscure streaking, with the area from belly down to the crissum usually being unpatterned. Meanwhile, the dark morph adult can range from all dark chocolate brown to almost pure black with variable browner edges, relieved only by the greyish inner half of tail as well as some greyish tail bars.

Most juvenile changeable hawk-eagles are dark brown above but with far more conspicuous white edges on mantle and wings than the adults, in some cases, the median coverts are largely white and greater and even lesser coverts are largely scaled with white. The juvenile has a light brown tail with about seven thin dark bars and a whitish tip. The young hawk-eagle's head varies from buff with white-tipped black crest (as is the case in peninsular India and Sri Lanka) through entirely whitish, but almost always the young birds are spotted and streaked with black or dark brown about the rear crown and nape. As is the head, the underparts are variable with juveniles in much of India and in Sri Lanka showing thin brown streaks on chest or small spots on breast, with obscure tawny barring on thigh, legs and crissum. Juveniles elsewhere are often nearly all pure whitish below. By the time the young hawk-eagles reaches their 2nd to 3rd year, they tend to show less white above and more brown or black below. Their tail starts to molt to resemble that of adults in the 3rd year but in the 2nd year in N. c. limnaeetus (or at least in Philippines). Changeable hawk-eagles may attempt to breed at 3 years of age but full adult plumage is not obtained until the 4th year. Adults have yellow to orange yellow eyes, while those of the juvenile are grey-brown to pale greenish. Adult have a cere that's grey to pale greenish yellow and juveniles' ceres are dull greyish, while all ages have yellow feet.

In flight, the changeable hawk-eagles is a large raptor with a prominent head, rather short rounded and broad wings, longish squarish or rounded tail, but has somewhat slenderer wings and straighter trailing edges than sympatric species of hawk-eagles. The species tends to fly with a fast agile flight, showing powerful shallow beats interspersed with glides on flat or bowed wings with their carpals well forward (above level of bill) and primaries swept back. When soaring, the wings are gently lowered or sometimes held level, with the carpals again well forward. In pale morph adults in flight, their hand in flight may be variously dark brownish buff (as in peninsular India) to a much paler buff or whitish. On the flight feathers, the area from wingtips extending to the primary and secondary feathers often have blackish barring, forming ragged lines from the carpals to rear axillaries with variable other dark marks elsewhere. Adult intermediate morph hawk-eagles have similar flight feathers but have grey-brown underparts with a less distinct, contrasting under-pattern. Meanwhile, in both juvenile and adult dark morph, the blackish-brown colour of the body extends to the hand but the base of their tail, their primaries and, less so, their secondaries are a much paler, contrasting grey with streaking similar to other changeable hawk-eagles. Typical juveniles show large areas of whitish streaking or mottling seen from above in flight. Juveniles from much of India and Sri Lanka show extensive darker tawny but obscure barring above and below, while other races are much whiter. Much like adult, the juvenile has dark tips to primary and greater coverts produce thin ragged diagonal bars but the barring tends to be thinner.

=== Voice ===
Call
Call of changeable hawk-eagle recorded in Parambikulam

The changeable hawk-eagle is often largely silent but in breeding season it may readily call, both from their perch or on the wing. Like many diurnal raptors, their calls are a form of high-pitched scream. The shrill ringing and loud call of the changeable hawk-eagle is various described in pattern of yeep-yip-yip-yip, rising kwip-kwip-kwip-kwee-ah and penetrating klee-leeuw (for birds from the Sunda islands). Ascending kri-kri-kri-kree-ah and kreeee-krit with much stress on the elongated first syllable are similar. From western birds from India and Sri Lanka, the call is a slightly different ki-ki-ki-ki-ki-ki-ki-keee, beginning short, rising in crescendo and ending in long, drawn-out scream. In northern India and Malaysia, the calls of this species have variously been compared to those of the Eurasian curlew (Numenius arquatus) and the crested serpent eagle (Spilornis cheela).

=== Confusion species ===
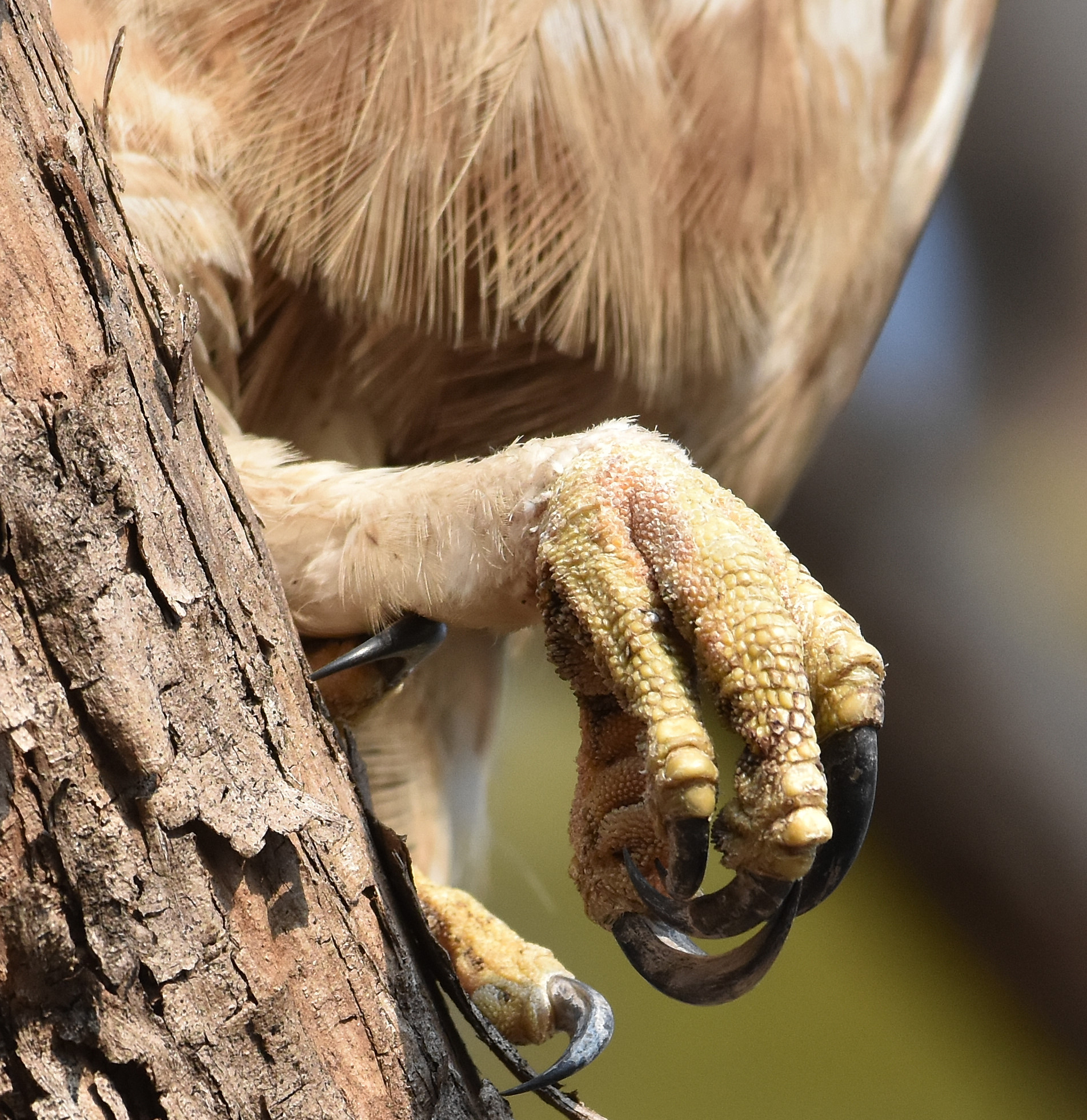
The formidable talons of the changeable hawk-eagle

The changeable hawk-eagle is almost always the most common and/or most widely spread Nisaetus species anywhere in their range. Their distribution overlaps with the entirety of the distribution of the (newly recognized) Legge's hawk-eagle (N. kelaarti), most of the range of the Javan (N. bartelsi), Blyth's (N. alboniger) and Wallace's hawk-eagle (N. nanus) and partially overlaps with the ranges of the mountain hawk-eagle (N. nipalensis), the Philippine hawk-eagle (N. philippinus) (on Mindoro and possibly Palawan) and Pinsker's hawk-eagle (N. pinskeri) (on Mindanao). Only two species of the genus Nisaetus are outside the changeable hawk-eagle's normal distribution (including their own former subspecies, the Flores hawk-eagle).

In range with most other Nisaetus species (such as the islands or mainland of southeast Asia), the changeable hawk-eagle is more likely to be almost crestless. Other species tend to have proportionately broader wings with more bulging secondaries, relatively shorter tails and, as adults, more barred underbody and unique tail patterns. Adult colour patterns can range from somewhat different to boldly distinct (especially in the black-and-white Blyth's hawk-eagle). Juveniles tend to be more difficult to distinguish but usually most other Nisaetus have less white showing than relevant changeable hawk-eagles and the changeable tends to show a slightly stronger V while in flight. The mountain hawk-eagle, Flores hawk-eagle (which is the only hawk-eagle in its small-island range) and Legge's hawk-eagle, in decreasing magnitude of size, are all are larger and bulkier than the changeable hawk-eagle whereas other Nisaetus species are smaller to varying degrees, distinctly so in the Wallace's hawk-eagle and Blyth's hawk-eagle. As many honey buzzards are thought to mimic more powerful raptors to protect themselves from predation, the crested honey buzzard (Pernis ptilorhynchus) is thought to mimic the general appearance of Nisaetus hawk-eagles but has a distinctly smaller head and longer and narrower wings than changeable hawk-eagles. Adult crested honey buzzards are barred but the juvenile is streaked rather like the changeable hawk-eagle, however if seen well the honey buzzard generally looks much more solidly orange-buffy as a base colour rather than whitish below. The flight actions of the honey buzzard are also distinct, with a more robotic even flap during flights.

Juvenile crested serpent eagles, which are unlikely to be mistaken for the changeable other than at a distance and in flight, appear chunkier and less rangy with a bigger head, slightly longer wings and a substantially shorter tailed with fewer bars (these differences in proportions are generally applicable to various island serpent-eagle species that may be found with changeable hawk-eagles as well). Juvenile rufous-bellied eagles (Lophotriorchis kienerii) are rather smaller and more compact with a relatively longer winged and shorter tailed appearance. The rufous-bellied juvenile when compared to the juvenile changeable is generally purer white looking below which contrasts more strongly with their sparse blackish streaks. Dark morph changeable hawk-eagles may be confused with the similarly sized but even more slender black eagle (Ictinaetus malaiensis). However, the latter is much longer winged with distinctly pinched-in bases, a uniformly dark tail and has small light feather bases only to primaries. Also dark morph can be told from dark morph booted eagles (Hieraeetus pennatus) by the latter being rather smaller, much shorter tailed and having relatively longer and more rectangular wings. Dark morph booted eagles are also grey-brown or cinnamon from below on the tail and have pale wedges on the underside of the primaries.

== Distribution and habitat ==
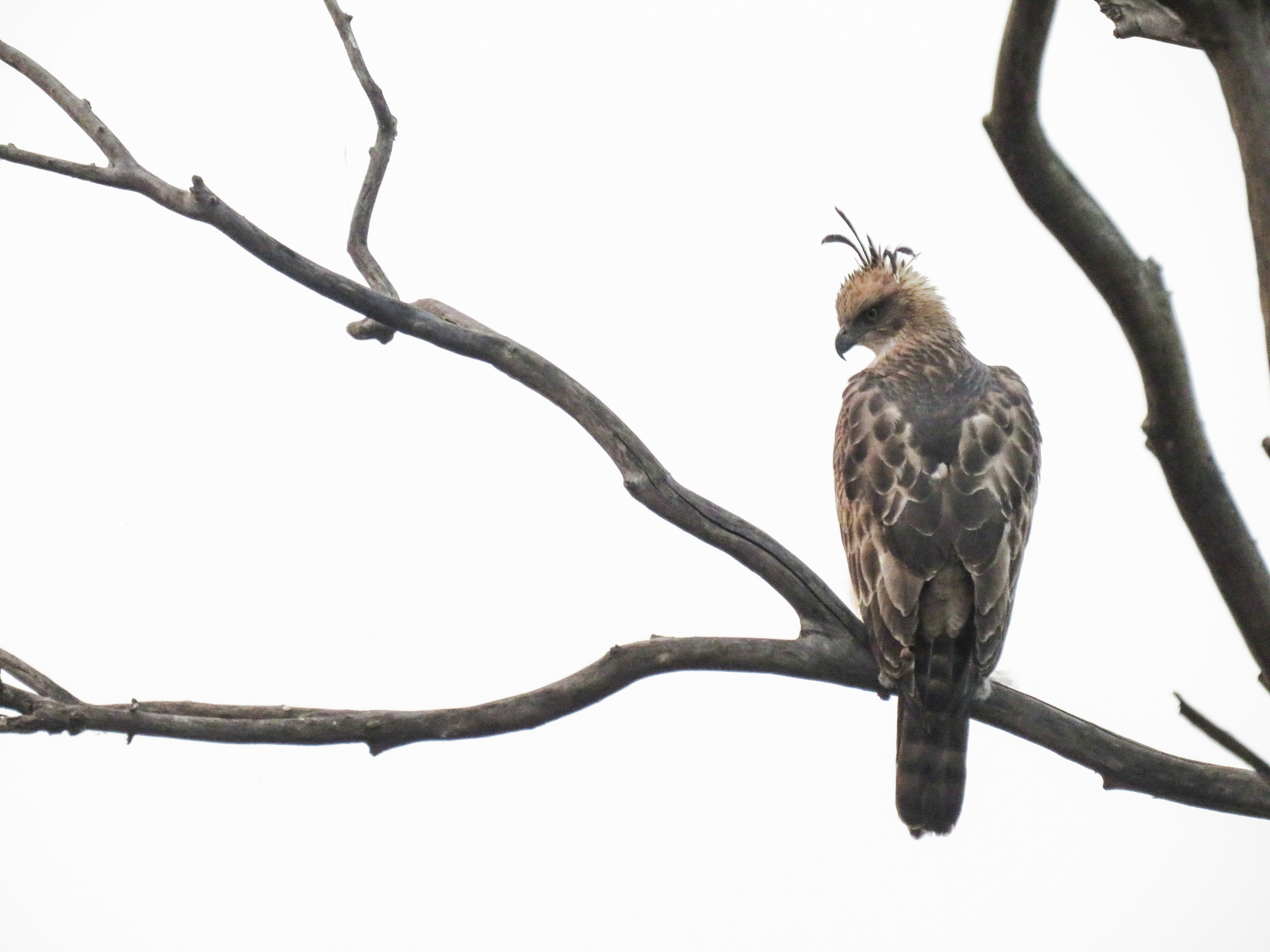
Changeable hawk-eagle in Bandhavgarh National Park

The extensive range of the changeable hawk-eagle includes much of the Indian subcontinent and Southeast Asia. Its distribution includes Garhwal Himalaya to Assam, southern Nepal and Bhutan, Sri Lanka, east through Myanmar, Thailand and Peninsular Malaysia, western Laos, southern Vietnam, Cambodia. In India, it occurs almost continuously from the peninsular tip north to Rajasthan, Uttar Pradesh, Bihar, Odisha and the Andaman Islands. In Indonesia, it occurs in Sumatra, Simeulue and Mentawai off the west side and Riau, Bangka Island and Belitung, Java, Borneo; and the western and southern Philippines on Palawan, Calamian Islands, Lubang Island, Mindoro, Mindanao and Bohol.

The changeable hawk-eagle inhabits savannawoodland, agricultural land, wetlands, tea plantations, forest villages and even suburbs. Beyond these often degraded haunts, it ranges also in open or less dense parts of undisturbed vast evergreen forest and tropical and subtropical dry broadleaf forestss, but also secondary forests. In elevation, they may be found anywhere from sea level to 2,200 m (7,200 ft) but mainly live below 1,500 m (4,900 ft).

== Behaviour and ecology ==
Changeable hawk-eagle eating grey junglefowl in Bandipur National Park

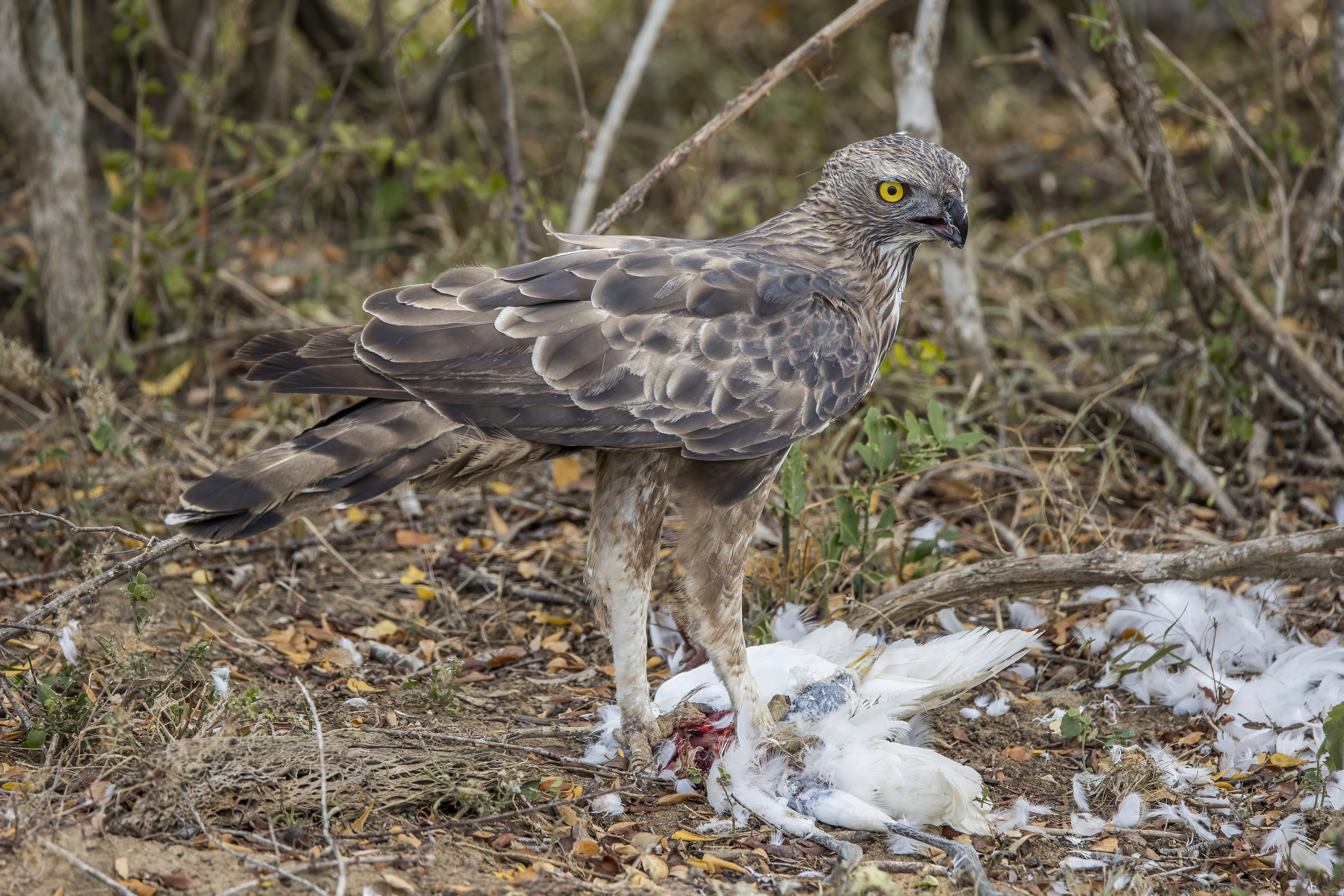
Changeable hawk-eagle eating an egret in Sri Lanka

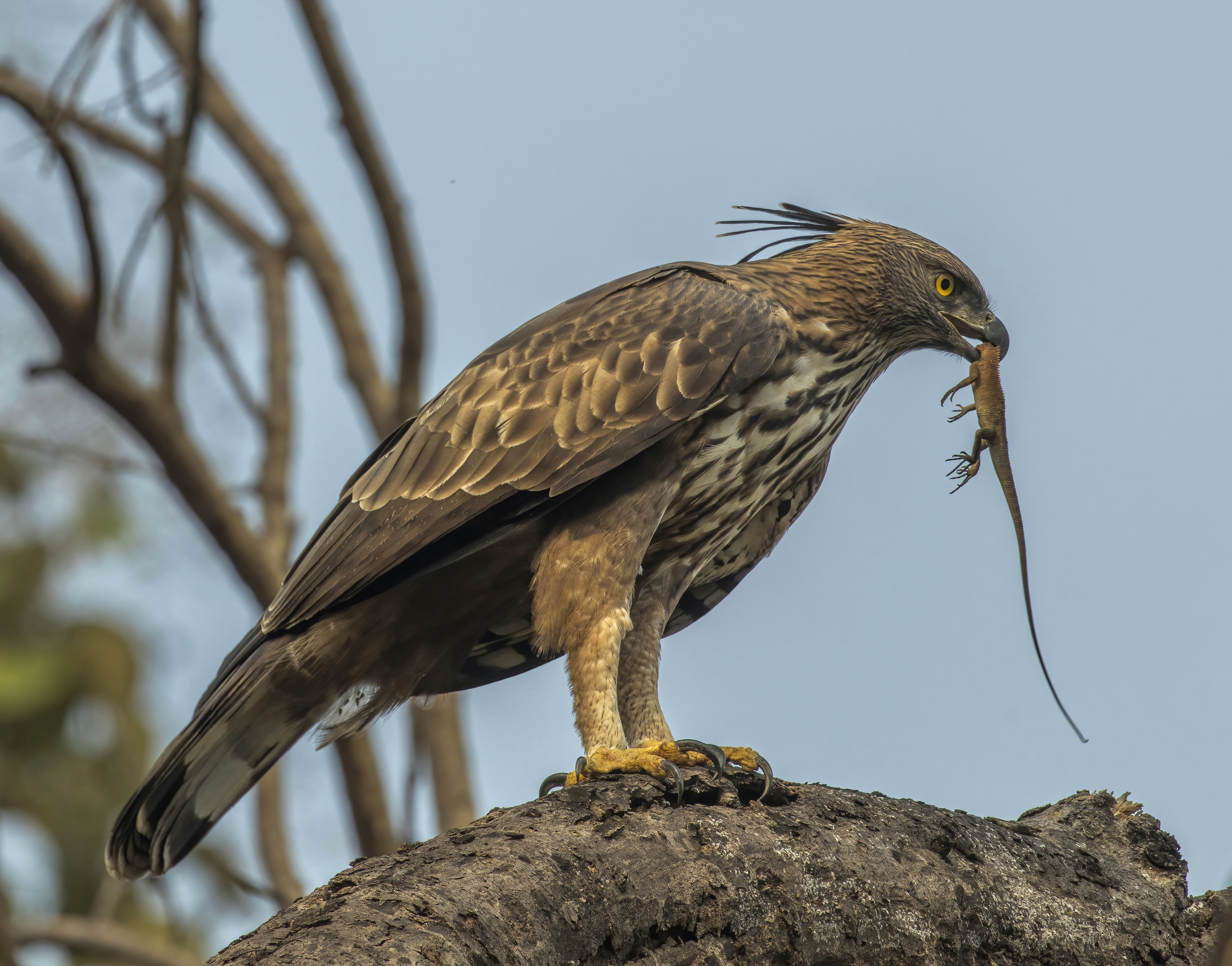
Changeable hawk-eagle with Indian garden lizard in Satpura National Park

Changeable hawk-eagles are at home in a variety of wooded and semi-open habitats. Their physical form and flight style is typical of forest-dwelling raptors in general and is often compared to the features of true hawks or Accipiters in particular larger species such as goshawks. Like most other forest raptors, changeable hawk-eagles (and Nisaetus species in general) have a long tail, short broad wings and relatively long but powerful legs, all of which impart greater maneuverability and quicker strike times in denser wooded hunting grounds than other raptorial body plans. The common name hawk-eagle is apparently in reference to their similar adaptations to true hawks. Even compared to the variable prey of large goshawks, the prey selection of changeable hawk-eagles appears to be somewhat indiscriminate and opportunistic. Unfortunately, compared to tropical raptors from the neotropics and especially Africa, the life histories of raptors from tropical Asia are generally quite poorly-known, even in the case of easily observed raptors such as changeable hawk-eagles. Therefore, what is known of changeable hawk-eagles dietary biology is largely drawn together based on reliable eye-witness and anecdotal accounts, photographic evidence and wide-ranging bird census surveys, rather than direct, extensive study. The changeable hawk-eagle can show a slight preference for birds as prey, but also freely takes various mammals, reptiles and some other vertebrates whenever they opportune upon them. Although little quantitative analysis has gone into their dietary habits, many prey items taken are relatively small. On the other hand, Brown & Amadon (1986) description of this species as "not a very rapacious bird" is not entirely justified as extremely large prey relative to the hawk-eagle's size may also be readily taken. Like many tropical forest raptors, they are primarily ambush predators who use concealing foliage to still-hunt from hidden branch or open branch with a leafy background, pouncing fast to take most of their prey on the ground. Like goshawks, changeable hawk-eagles often perch-hunts which are short, low-level flights from perch to perch interspersed with brief pauses, during which they scan for potential prey. Perch-hunting lends them the greatest success when hunting birds that they will capture in the trees. At least a few cases have been observed of changeable hawk-eagles watching for and then dropping on prey directly from their own nest.

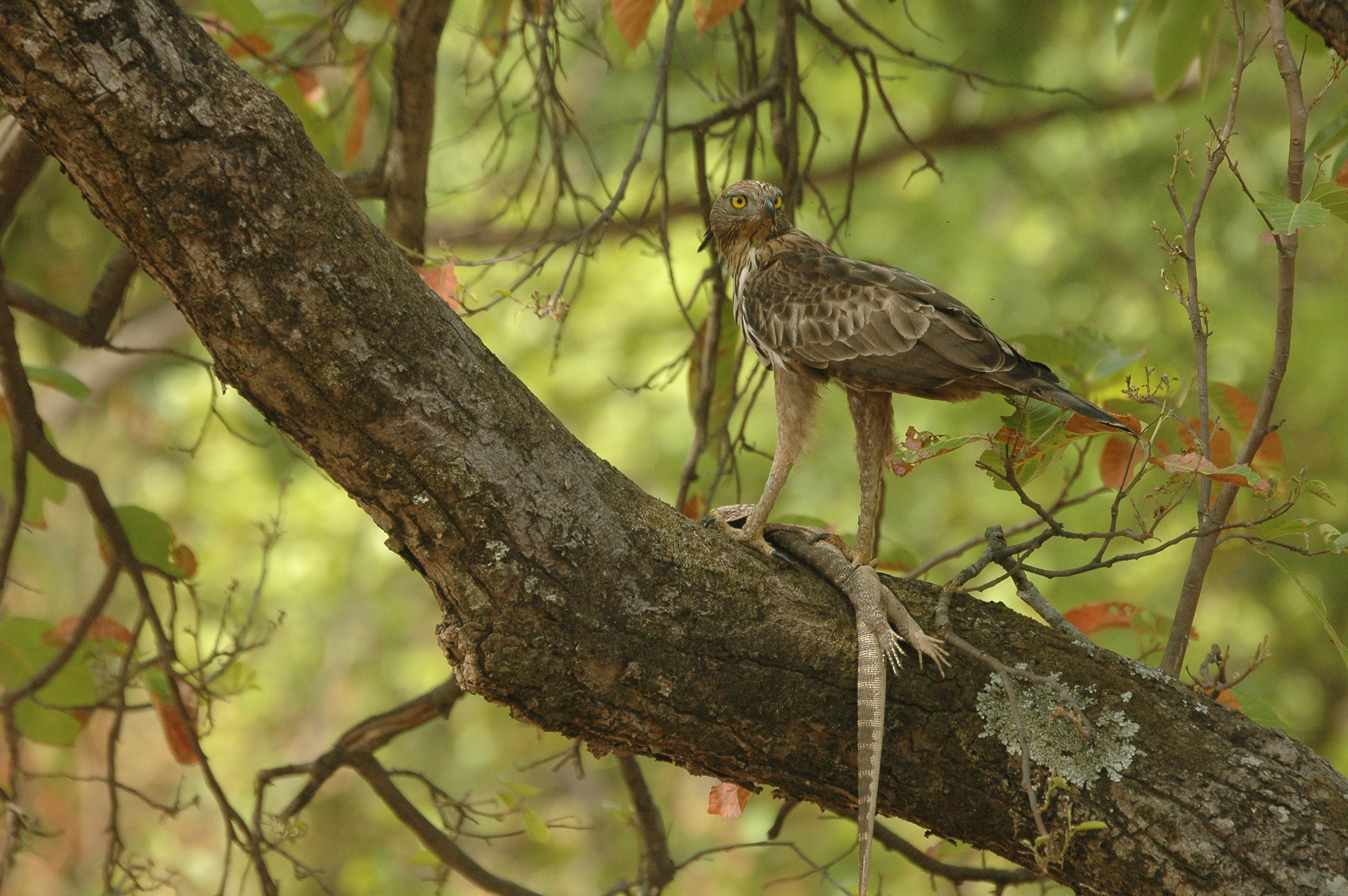
Changeable hawk-eagle eating a monitor lizard in Maharashtra

One of the only general analysis of the quantitative food preferences of the changeable hawk-eagle (although detailed prey analysis, including prey species, was not specified), was a study of this species in contrast with five other raptor species in the Maharashtra of India. This showed that they had a preference for birds as prey, with nearly equal number of birds classified as small or large making up nearly half of their diet in 14 active territories. Furthermore, their prey selection was found to be somewhat similar by class to that of Bonelli's eagle (Aquila fasciata), an eagle of much more open and rocky habitats, but the changeable hawk-eagle took the highest class diversity of prey of any of the six raptors studied and was the only one to hunt near heavily wooded areas. Primary prey by class differed in West Java, where 62% of prey selected was reptiles, 24% birds and 12% mammals. Elsewhere in India, prey selection at the nest showed what prey species were selected by changeable hawk-eagles but lacked any quantitative data or studies on prey biomass. One study in Gujarat showed several rather small prey species largely being taken such as the Indian chameleon (Chamaeleo zeylanicus), Oriental garden lizard (Calotes versicolor), other lizards, common myna (Acridotheres tristis), red-vented bulbul (Pycnonotus cafer), other birds (including unidentified parakeets and gamebirds), Indian bush rat (Golunda ellioti) and a palm squirrel. The identified prey would vary in size only from 35 g (1.2 oz) for a garden lizard to 117 g (4.1 oz) for a myna with the small lizards and chameleons reportedly the most often delivered prey. In Mudumalai National Park, only three prey types were specified to genera which consisted of black-hooded oriole (Orolus xanthornus), common bronzeback snake (Dendrelaphis tristis) and an unidentified giant squirrel. Not all nests have relatively small prey, as one nest in northern India showed a prey composition of red junglefowl (Gallus gallus), large woodpeckers such as flamebacks and larger parakeets. Alongside various junglefowl and the domestic chicken derived from them, virtually any gamebird seem to be nearly ideal prey for changeable hawk-eagles and several species, including peafowl, bush quail, spurfowl and francolins, are known to be hunted, including both young and adults. Many other birds with partial terrestrial habits seem to be taken quite widely including various pigeons and doves, rails and other water birds.

The upper size limit for changeable hawk-eagle prey seems to be fairly liquid and the species is quite the equal of various other booted eagles in making bold attacks on prey of their own size or larger. Many of the mammals reported as preyed upon by changeable hawk-eagles are quite large. Mammalian prey taken as adults has included hispid hares (Lepus hispidus) with a median estimated weight of 2.35 kg (5.2 lb), Indian hare (Lepus nigricollis) with a median mass of 2.7 kg (6.0 lb), 1.3 kg (2.9 lb) Indian flying fox (Pteropus giganteus) and nearly any species of giant squirrel, which can vary in weight between 1.1 and 3 kg (2.4 and 6.6 lb). Even more impressive accounts and photos show that changeable hawk-eagle can hunt and kill adult mammals with formidable defenses such as felids and primates, although it cannot be ruled out that they will usually attack infirm or injured specimens rather than healthy ones. Furthermore, most accounts of attacks on Old World monkeys show juveniles are by far the most vulnerable members of their troops to hawk-eagle attacks. Cases of either verified, likely or potential predation have been reported on northern pig-tailed macaque (Macaca leonina), crab-eating macaque (Macaca fascicularis), toque macaque (Macaca sinica) and lion-tailed macaque (Macaca silenus), including specimens potentially to weigh up to an estimated 6 kg (13 lb). A case of predation was photographed by a changeable hawk-eagle on an estimated 1.9 kg (4.2 lb) juvenile banded langur (Presbytis femoralis) while possible cases have been reported of predation on juveniles of other langurs as well as additional larger primates such as gibbons and proboscis monkeys (Nasalis larvatus). While their predator-prey relationship is even more nebulous, the peculiar, smaller but toxic nocturnal primates known as slow lorises are known to fall prey as well to changeable hawk-eagles. There are several accounts of predation by changeable hawk-eagles on domestic cats (Felis catus), though largely kittens, in addition to a case of a large adult jungle cat (Felis chaus), with an estimated median weight of 7.3 kg (16 lb), being attacked and killed by one of these hawk-eagles. Apparently, the changeable hawk-eagle is also counted among the predators of calves of Indian gazelles (Gazella bennetti). Adults of large monitor lizards of a few species may be also included in their prey spectrum. Avian kills include adult Indian peafowl (Pavo cristatus), of an estimated weight of up to 4 kg (8.8 lb), and the species is considered a threat as well to the similar green peafowl (Pavo muticus). Attempted predation on both 4.2 kg (9.3 lb) adult and young giant ibis (Thaumatibis gigantea) have been recorded but all known attacks were unsuccessful. Cases of scavenging on carcasses of various deer and monkey have been reported as well, in one case a hawk-eagle was filmed chasing an adult yellow-throated marten (Martes flavigula) from a carcass. Changeable hawk-eagles were also observing preying on predating on Oriental pied hornbills (Anthracoceros albirostris).

=== Food and feeding ===
The habitat selection and overall distribution of the changeable hawk-eagle is largely concurrent with other largish raptors such as the crested serpent eagle and the crested honey buzzard, apparently the three species are largely tolerant and non-aggressive towards each other, perhaps surprisingly given the otherwise aggressive habits of hawk-eagles. Unsurprisingly, these species have quite discrepant ecological niches, especially in terms of their dietary habits. Although nest predators are probably profuse, parent changeable hawk-eagles are likely to aggressive displace most potential threats. No verified accounts of predation are known in the wild and the species often likely fulfills the role of an apex predator. They are presumably able to persist alongside larger cousins such as mountain hawk-eagles and with Legge's hawk-eagle by focusing more so on reptiles and birds rather than the mammalian prey likely preferred by the larger species (as well as perhaps focusing primarily on a smaller class of prey), although it is somewhat more adaptable in habitat than both other species. They are also found living alongside the much larger Philippine eagle (Pithecophaga jefferyi) and are likely to similarly take smaller prey and avoid direct encounters with the much less numerous giant eagle. In turn, changeable hawk-eagles are likely avoided in encounters with smaller forest raptors such as other, smaller Nisaetus species, which often focus slightly less on birds than the changeable, and Accipiter hawks, which all subsist largely on rather smaller classes of prey. Apparently, changeable hawk-eagle are considered likely predators of the slightly smaller Indian spotted eagles (Clanga hastata). However, on the contrary, one case of predation was reported in captivity when a barred eagle-owl (Bubo sumatranus), which is found in the wild with changeable hawk-eagles in southeast Asia, killed a changeable hawk-eagle in an aviary.

=== Breeding ===
The changeable hawk-eagle is, like many raptorial birds, a largely solitary bird otherwise but during breeding, stays in a dedicated pairs that often mate for life. Each pair engages in a territorial display over the fringes of their home range. This aerial display is usually engaged in by a male but sometimes the female or both members of the pair will engage in displays, often starting with their wings and tail arched upwards in exaggerated poises. During the display, the shoot up vertically and nose-diving or stooping, if the rival hawk-eagle continues to engage the defending individual, they will fly at each other at "lightening speed" doing a complete loop-the-loop turn in air. They often call loudly throughout the display. The breeding season of changeable hawk-eagles falls from November to May in southern India, peaking January–March, while it is more confined to January–April in the more temperate climate of the Himalayan foothills. The breeding season from India is comparable in Sri Lanka but is slightly more prolonged in the latter country, continuing at times into June. However, peak laying dates fall earlier, around January–February, in Sri Lanka. In the equatorial Greater Sunda islands, eggs have been recorded in 8 different months at any time from December to October with peak activity falling usually between February and August. Apparently, the highest volume of eggs laid here fall in two separate periods, February–March and July–August. Thus, the breeding season is more elastic in tropical forests areas but in northern part of range the breeding season centers around the cooler dry season. This species builds a largish stick nest. Typical dimensions of their nest is 95 to 105 cm (37 to 41 in) across while nest depth can range from 35 to 120 cm (14 to 47 in) the latter after repeated uses and additions. Some nests are very large relative to the size of these eagles. One nest reached a diameter on the inside of 1.3 m (4 ft 3 in) and a circumference of 3.45 m (11.3 ft). Active nests are lined with green leaves. Both members of the pair participate in building new nests and take part in repairs. Nests are often solidly built and resilient, more so than those of other medium-sized eagles, against high winds and monsoons. Nest height is often from 6 to 50 m (20 to 164 ft) in the crown or high fork of a large tree, but is usually not less than 12 m (39 ft) off the ground. Nest height in the Indian subcontinent was typically around 12 to 25 m (39 to 82 ft), averaging 17 m (56 ft) in the Shoolpaneshwar Wildlife Sanctuary and 19 m (62 ft) in the Indo-Gangetic Plain, and could be in a wide diversity of trees. Nesting sites are often near a stream, or otherwise perhaps near a ravine with wide view but sometimes varies from deep forest to isolated trees on village edges. In the peri-urban green spaces of Singapore, changeable hawk-eagles nested mostly on Albizia trees, which are among the fastest-growing and tallest trees in these secondary forests. The parents tend to allow closer approach by humans when living in vicinity of villages.

Only one egg is known to be laid by changeable hawk-eagles. The egg tends to be coarse and glossless, largely white but sparely and faintly speckled or blotched with light reddish. Egg sizes were reportedly measured in the nominate subspecies (sample of 40) as ranging from 65.3 to 73 mm (2.57 to 2.87 in) in height with an average of 68 mm (2.7 in) by a diameter of 49.9 to 53.3 mm (1.96 to 2.10 in) with an average of 52 mm (2.0 in). In the race N. c. ceylanensis, a sample of 24 eggs averaged 61.3 mm × 49.8 mm (2.41 in × 1.96 in). In N. c. limnaeetus from northern India, 18 eggs averaged 69.8 mm × 51.6 mm (2.75 in × 2.03 in). In the same subspecies, eggs from Java and Borneo ranged from 61 to 68.8 mm (2.40 to 2.71 in) in height and from 50 to 54 mm (2.0 to 2.1 in) in diameter. In the race N. c. andamanensis, the average was reportedly 62.2 mm × 50.1 mm (2.45 in × 1.97 in) but the sample size is unknown. Apparently, the female alone incubates, for a period estimated at 40 days. After the nestling hatches, the female will brood intensively for about 25 days. An Indian nestling was found to weigh 300 g (11 oz) at 14 days and grew to 450 g (16 oz) by 20 days, having developed a vocabulary of cheep notes to express hunger and alarm. The eaglet may be preening, standing more and wing flapping by 4 to 5 weeks old, and may also be encouraged to eat at by its mother, however consuming a single food item may take up to 6 hours at this point. At 35 days, the nestling may be brooded progressively less and feather and body size growth accelerates. Within a couple of weeks, prey is delivered (often by both parents at this stage) to nearby branches rather than directly to the nest with the parents calling as they approach, apparently encouraging the young eaglet to venture out of the nest. By 52 days of age, the eaglet is fully-grown but does not fledge until about 60–68 days. The total nest dependency was recorded as 81 days in India. However, the total breeding cycle was recorded as lasting about 112 days in West Java.

== Status ==
The changeable hawk-eagle apparently ranges over 13 million square kilometers across its range. An average of only 1 pair to every 1,200 km (750 mi) of its distribution would put the population well into five figures but their density is likely rather higher. This species is an exceptionally adaptable one not only by the standards of its genus but also by the standards of its subfamily. While deforestation has depleted the populations of their fellow Nisaetus species, resulting in four being classified as Endangered species, the changeable hawk-eagle has been shown to be remarkably resilient in the face of cutting and habitat degradation. This trend, holding steady in population or even increasing while other hawk-eagle species have declined, has been reported in the Indian subcontinent, Malaysia, Java and the Philippines as well as elsewhere in southeast Asia. In Java, the changeable hawk-eagle was found to persist in all seven habitat types available on the islands, whereas the Javan hawk-eagle was confined to only four habitat types: the deeper, primary forested areas. However, their adaptability can be overstated and this species requires tall trees (though secondary growth forest is acceptable), appropriate habitat composition and ample prey populations to flourish. It is likely they can persist in most variety of high grade forestry and urbanization but complete deforestation is the only major threat to this species. A more secondary concern, but potentially depleting populations in India at least, is that it will not infrequently hunt chickens (especially during breeding when such easy prey is hard to resist), which has in turn resulted in changeable hawk-eagles being locally persecuted.
