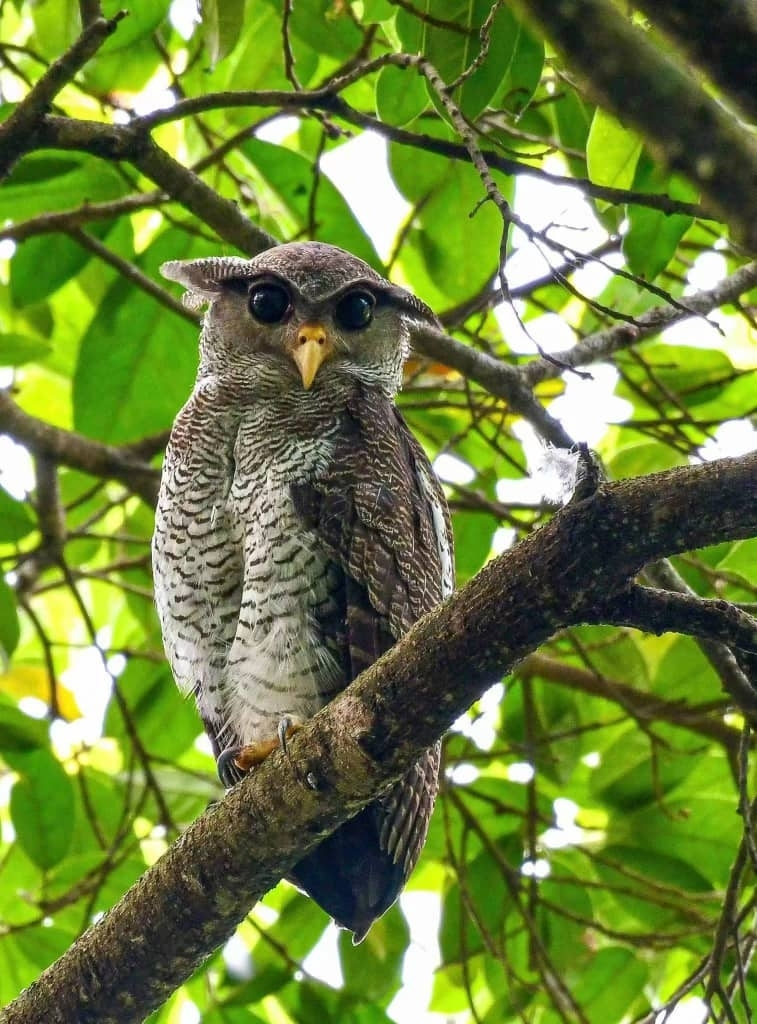
- Barred eagle-owl, Malaysia

Conservation status
- Near Threatened (IUCN 3.1)
- CITES Appendix II (CITES)

Scientific classification
- Kingdom: Animalia
- Phylum: Chordata
- Class: Aves
- Order: Strigiformes
- Family: Strigidae
- Genus: Ketupa
- Species: K. sumatrana

Binomial name
- Ketupa sumatrana (Raffles, 1822)
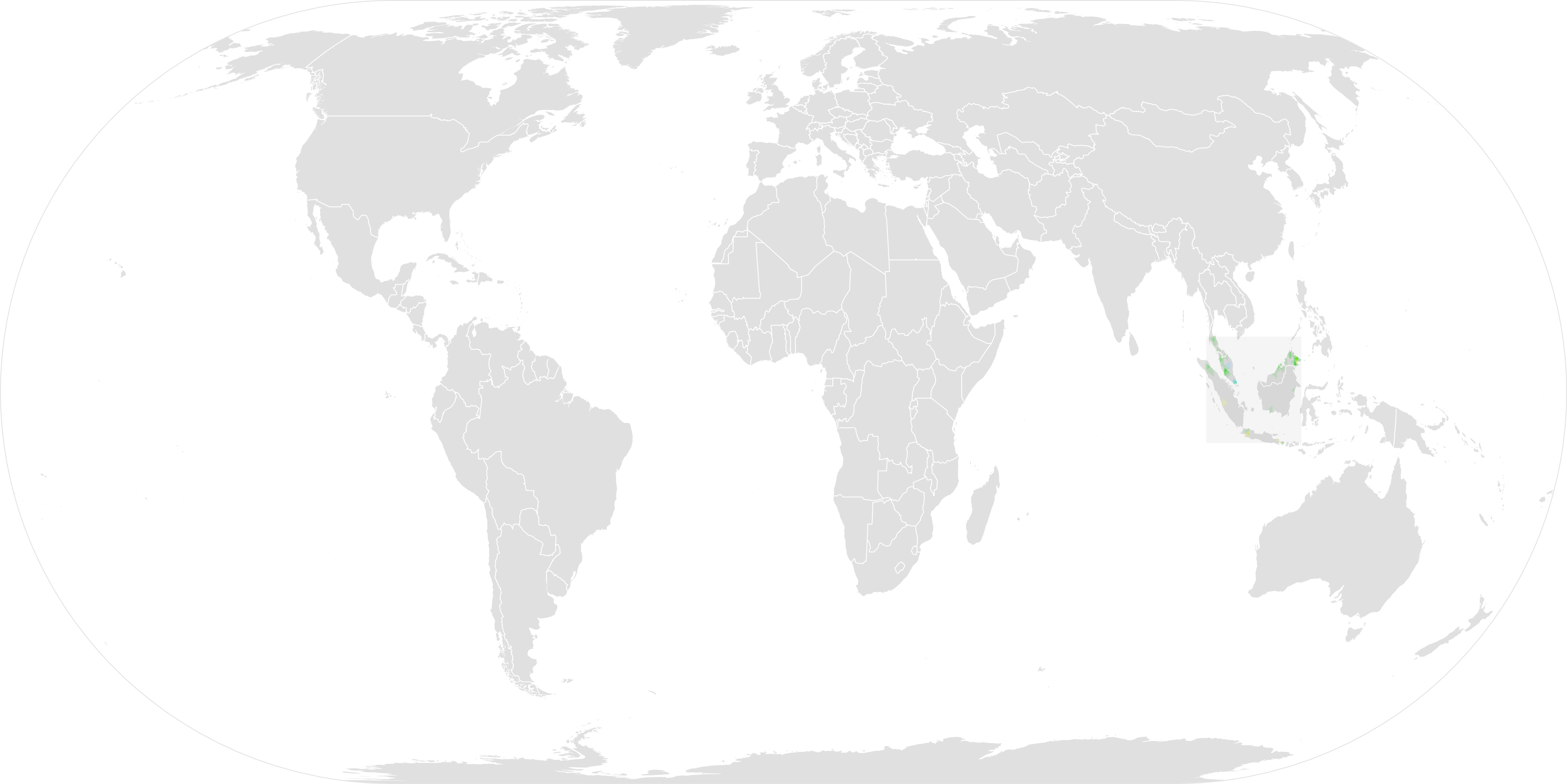
- Global map of eBird reports Year-Round Range Summer Range Winter Range

= Barred eagle-owl =

Species of owl

The barred eagle-owl (Ketupa sumatrana), also called the Malay eagle-owl, is a species of eagle owl in the family Strigidae. It is a member of the large genus Ketupa, which is found on most of the world's continents. This relatively little-known species is found from the southern Malay Peninsula down a string of several of the larger southeast Asian islands to as far as Borneo. It forms a superspecies with the physically similar but larger spot-bellied eagle-owl (Ketupa nipalensis), although the two species appear to be allopatric in distribution.

== Distribution and habitat ==
It is found in Brunei, Indonesia, Malaysia, Myanmar, Singapore, and Thailand. Its natural habitat is subtropical or tropical moist lowland forests. It typically is a resident of evergreen forests with pools or streams, but also ranges into large gardens with tall, densely foliated trees, such as the Bogor Botanical Gardens found in West Java as well as wooded groves in cultivated country, both sometimes not far from human habitations. It usually ranges in elevation from sea-level to roughly 1,000 m (3,300 ft) but can range up to about 1,600 m (5,200 ft) or more at locations like Mount Gede in West Java and Mount Singgalang in West Sumatra.

== Description ==
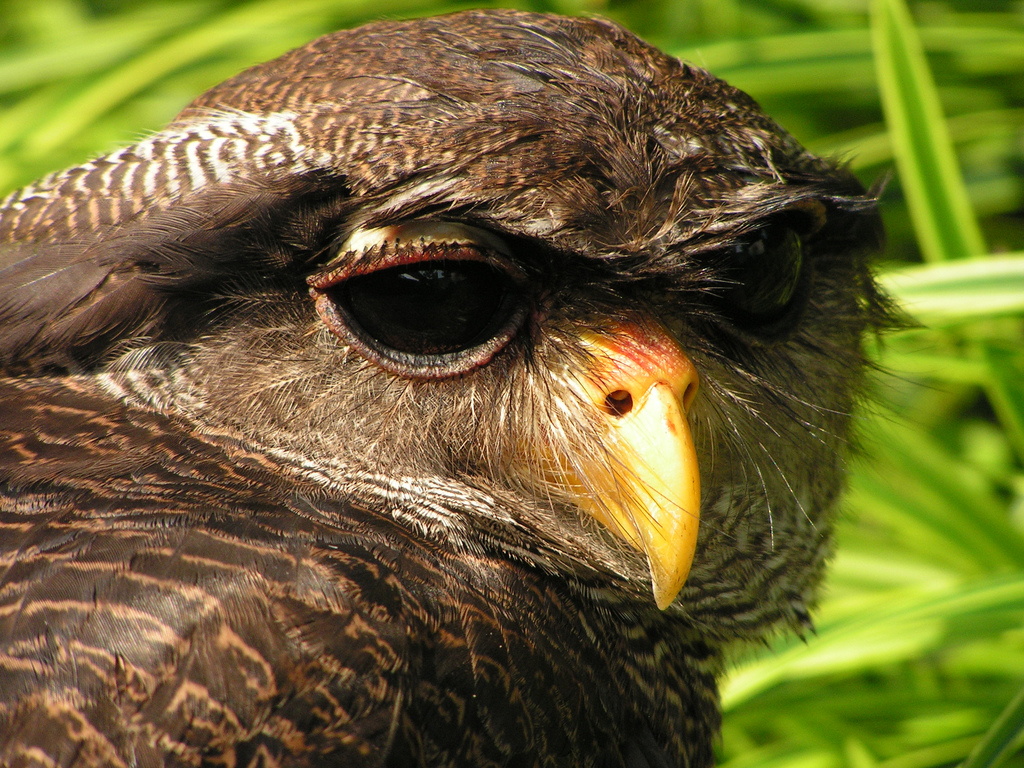
The face of a barred eagle-owl

The barred eagle-owl is a fairly large owl but relatively small eagle-owl, ranging from 40 to 48 cm (16 to 19 in) in length. There is almost no size sexual dimorphism in this species (although some females are marginally larger than the males) and adjacent island subspecies vary dramatically in size, both unusual attributes for eagle-owls. It is most distinctive due to its barred underparts, large but sideways-slanting ear tufts, a white bar running from the eyebrows through the front of the ear-tufts and much more heavily marked breast than belly. The face and lores are a dirty grayish-white colour. The eyes are usually a dark brown colour, but occasionally yellow eyes have been reported. The bill and cere are pale yellow, with an occasional greenish tinge to the cere. The upperparts are grey-brown, crossed and mottled with several zigzag bars of rufous-tawny colour, being broadest on the back. The upper-tail is dark brown with about six whitish or tawny bars. The tarsi are feathered to the toe joint. The juvenile barred eagle-owls are pure white in their natal down. The mesoptile stage in transition to adult plumage, is still a dirty white but is banded with brown on the wings and tail and the ear-tufts are much shorter than on mature birds.

=== Identification ===
A potential but unlikely confusion species is the brown wood owl (Strix leptogrammica), which is also barred below but as a Strix lacks this species distinctive ear-tufts. The brown wood owl also has much more rufous-brown color, a strongly defined brownish-cinnamon face disc and more extensive feathering on its feet, which can almost totally cover their feet but for the talons. Fish owls have no feathering on their tarsi, more tawny overall colour and lack the white stripe on the head and ear-tufts. Another species that occurs in the northern part of the range of the barred eagle-owl is the dusky eagle-owl (Ketupa coromanda), but that species has a sandy, warm brown colour, possesses vertical barring on the underside, bears minimal contrasting whitish barring to the plumage and face and the eyes are yellow. The spot-bellied eagle owl, with which the barred eagle-owl forms a superspecies, is much more superficially similar than any of the above owls but apparently does not overlap in the wild. The spot-bellied species is much larger and has bolder spotting below, otherwise it is almost identical.

=== Voice ===
The barred fish-owl territorial song or call is a deep hoot, hoo or hoo-hoo also sometimes transliterated as whooa-who, whooa-who. The hoots slightly drop in pitch towards the end. If it is a double-hoot, there is an interval of about two seconds between the hoots. Other vocalizations known for this species include a noisy cackle of various syllables, fearful shrikes and strangulate noises, normally uttered in the early evening. In Borneo, the barred eagle-owl's flight call is described as several hoots followed by a groan. In some local mythology on Java, the species' calls are considered as those of demons.

=== Subspecies ===
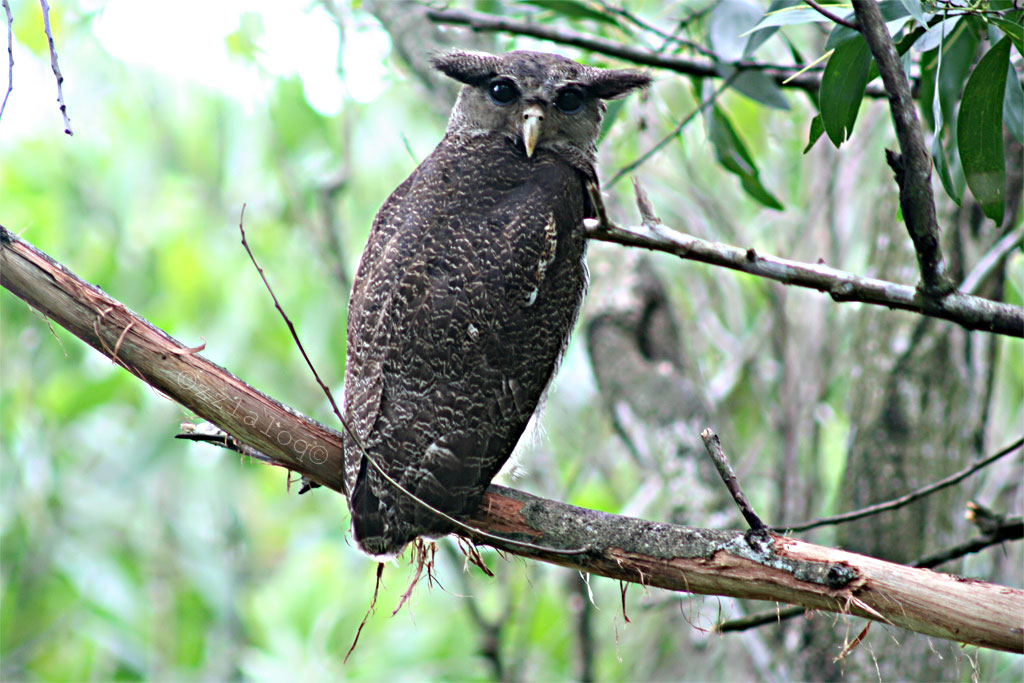
A barred eagle-owl in Malaysia of the relatively small K. sumatrana sumatrana subspecies

- K. sumatrana sumatrana (Raffles, 1822)- Also referred to as the "nominate subspecies". Found on Sumatra, Bangka and the Malay Peninsula. This race is relatively small and the bands on the belly are not as dark or as widely spaced as on Javan birds. The wing chord is 323 to 358 mm (12.7 to 14.1 in). The tail is 183 to 190 mm (7.2 to 7.5 in). Body mass of one bird was reportedly 620 g (1.4 lb).
- K. sumatrana strepitans (Temminck, 1823)- Found on Java and Bali. This race is considerably larger than the nominate race with broader and dense barring on the underparts. The wing chord is 370 to 417 mm (14.6 to 16.4 in). Weight in this race can reportedly range from 1,427 to 1,606 g (3.1 to 3.5 lb), with an average of 1,525 g (3.4 lb).
- B. sumatrana tenuifasciata (Mees, 1964)- Found only on the island of Borneo. This race is similar in size to the nominate race but its bands are much finer and closer together. The wing chord is 323 to 350 mm (12.7 to 13.8 in).

== Behaviour and ecology ==
=== Food and feeding ===
What little is known of the dietary habits of the barred eagle-owl indicates it has a very broad, opportunistic diet. Much like other eagle-owls, the barred eagle-owl has large, powerful feet for its size with large, heavy, slightly curved talons, indicating a diverse diet that can extend to relatively large prey given the opportunity. Known foods have included large insects (i.e. grasshoppers and beetles), birds, small mammals (especially rodents including many mice and rats), and reptiles, largely snakes. In one instance, a barred eagle-owl preyed on a young crab-eating macaque (Macaca fascicularis), which even at a young age is likely to be as large or larger than the eagle-owl. When held in captivity, this species is not choosy and will consume fresh meat from fish, birds and mammals. In one instance, when kept in an aviary with a changeable hawk-eagle (Nisaetus cirrhatus), the owl killed and consumed the hawk-eagle despite its similar body size, indicative of a ferocity and lack of discrimination in regards to prey species, once again similar to other eagle-owls.

=== Breeding ===
This species probably pairs for life. Barred eagle-owls seems to be very attached to a particular nesting site. If not disturbed, they will occupy the same territory for several years and, if one partner dies, the surviving mate will maintain the same territory with another owl parent. This species nests either in large tree cavities or, in Java and Sumatra, on top of the large fern Asplenium nidus. The only other known nesting location has been at the base of an epiphyte large enough to form a sheltered hollow against a large branch. Only one egg is laid. The egg is white with an oval shape, measuring about 59.8 mm × 47.9 mm (2.4 in × 1.9 in). In Java, eggs have been found from February to April and nests with young from May to June. In Sumatra, nestlings or dependent young have been observed in March through May and in Borneo, young have been observed in February and March.

== Population ==
This species is found at low densities with large territories, as can be expected for most large birds of prey, but it is not uncommon. It is less common than the buffy fish owl on Java and Sumatra.
