= Mearnsetin =

- Chemical structure of mearnsetin

Names
- IUPAC name 3,3′,5,5′,7-Pentahydroxy-4′-methoxyflavone
- Systematic IUPAC name 2-(3,5-Dihydroxy-4-methoxyphenyl)-3,5,7-trihydroxy-4H-1-benzopyran-4-one
- Other names 4'-Methylmyricetin

Identifiers
CAS Number	16805-10-0
3D model (JSmol)	Interactive image
ChemSpider	8534833
PubChem CID	10359384
UNII	8NQ5Q3Q5ES
CompTox Dashboard (EPA)	DTXSID20438720
- InChI: InChI=1S/C16H12O8/c1-23-16-9(19)2-6(3-10(16)20)15-14(22)13(21)12-8(18)4-7(17)5-11(12)24-15/h2-5,17-20,22H,1H3 Key: HKEQVXVLTOSXLQ-UHFFFAOYSA-N; InChI=1/C16H12O8/c1-23-16-9(19)2-6(3-10(16)20)15-14(22)13(21)12-8(18)4-7(17)5-11(12)24-15/h2-5,17-20,22H,1H3 Key: HKEQVXVLTOSXLQ-UHFFFAOYAX
- SMILES: COC1=C(C=C(C=C1O)C2=C(C(=O)C3=C(C=C(C=C3O2)O)O)O)O

Properties
Chemical formula	C_{16}H_{12}O_{8}
Molar mass	332.264 g·mol^{−1}
- Except where otherwise noted, data are given for materials in their standard state (at 25 °C [77 °F], 100 kPa). verify (what is ?) Infobox references

Mearnsetin is an O-methylated flavonol. It can be found in Eucalyptus globulus and in Elaeocarpus lanceofolius. The compound has antioxidative properties.

Mearnsetin 3,7-dirhamnoside can be found in the fern Asplenium antiquum.
