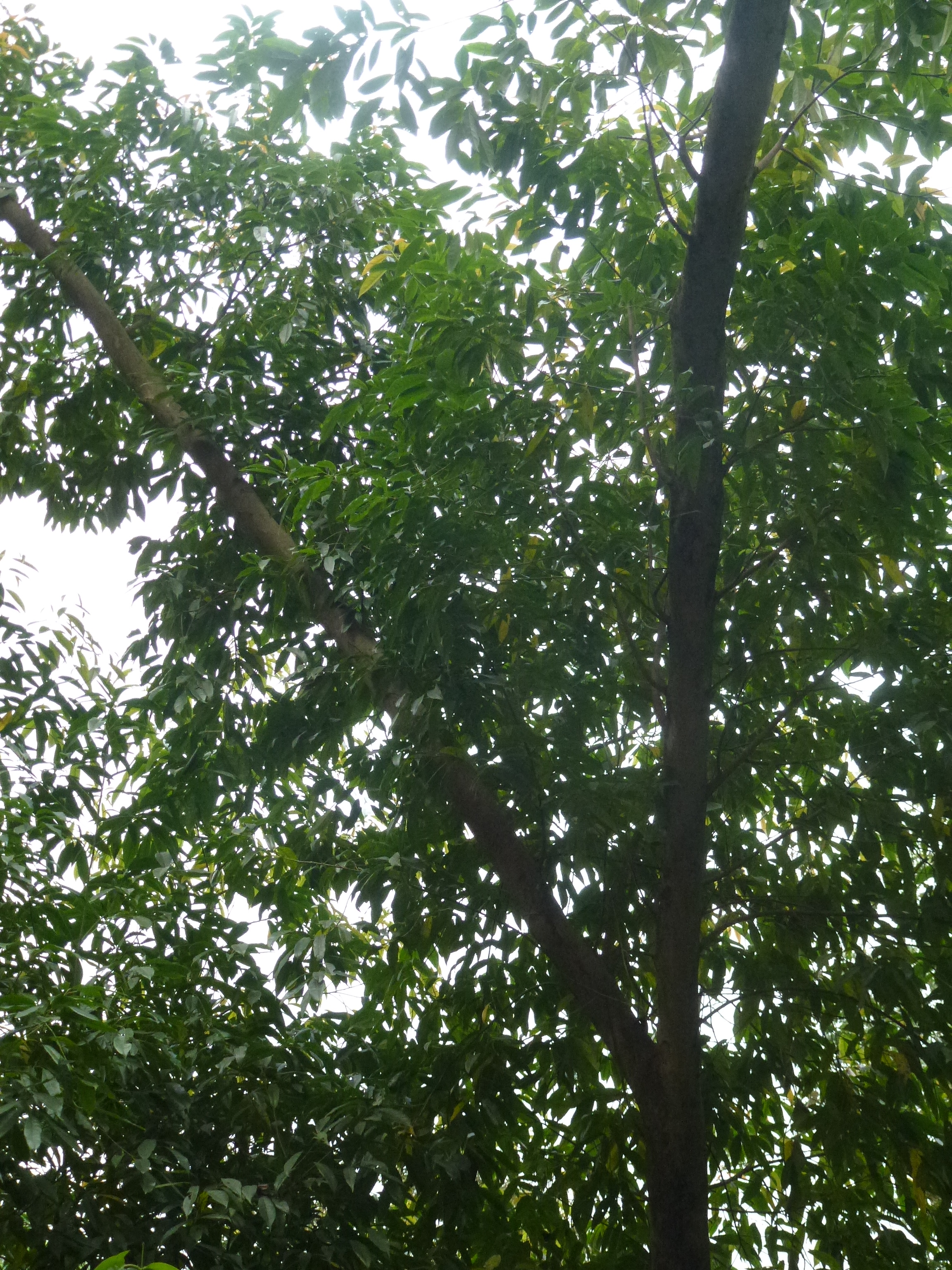

Scientific classification
- Kingdom: Plantae
- Clade: Tracheophytes
- Clade: Angiosperms
- Clade: Eudicots
- Clade: Rosids
- Order: Oxalidales
- Family: Elaeocarpaceae
- Genus: Elaeocarpus
- Species: E. lanceifolius

Binomial name
- Elaeocarpus lanceifolius Roxb.

Synonyms
- Elaeocarpus serrulatus Benth.

= Elaeocarpus lanceifolius =

Species of flowering plant native to Asia

Elaeocarpus lanceifolius is a tree species in the family Elaeocarpaceae. It is found across tropical Asia from Thailand to Yunnan to Nepal to Karnataka, India. It is used for its wood (construction, firewood, charcoal), fruit (food and medicine), and nuts (jewellery, rosaries).

== Description ==
A tall evergreen tree up to 20 m (66 ft) tall with gray-black bark and a dense crown. Some of its distinctive features are: glabrous branchlets; cuneate, more-or-less decurrent leaf bases; and leaves possessing 7 or 8 lateral veins per side with veinlets sparse. Flowers bisexual, white, with a 3–4 x 2–2.5 cm ovoid green drupe that has an inconspicuous exocarp and a bony, conspicuously verrucose endocarp, 1-loculed. The seeds are around 2 cm (0.8 in). It flowers from June to July and fruits from July to September in China. April to June is the flowering season in India, with fruit appearing July to September.

== Distribution ==
The plant is found in: Thailand; Cambodia; Vietnam; China (northwest Yunnan); Laos; Myanmar; East Himalaya; India (Manipur, Nagaland, Assam, Arunachal Pradesh, Meghalaya, Sikkim, West Bengal, Andhra Pradesh, Karnataka); Bangladesh; Bhutan, and eastern Nepal.

== Habitat ==
In Cambodia, Laos and Vietnam it is found in secondary or flooded forests. On the Bokor Plateau of Preah Monivong Bokor National Park, Cambodia, the plant is found in sclerophyllous stunted forest on rocky sandy soil near the Bokor Hill Station at the top of the plateau, around 1,055 m (3,461 ft). The tree occurs in Yunnan at altitudes of 2,300–2,600 m (7,500–8,500 ft). In the Himalayas, it grows at elevations up to 2000m, while in Nepal it occurs in open areas between 1,000 and 1,800 m (3,300 and 5,900 ft). Moist evergreen forests between 1,000 and 2,600 m (3,300 and 8,500 ft) are the habitats in India. Amongst the edible trees of the Neora Valley National Park, West Bengal, it is a frequently-found taxa.

== Vernacular Names ==
Common names of Elaeocarpus lanceifolius include: srakûm kach', rumdé:nh tük (Khmer); côm bộng (côm = Elaeocarpus), côm lá thon, côm lá đào (Vietnamese); 披针叶杜英, pi zhen ye du ying (Standard Chinese); badrayo (West Bengal).

== Uses ==
The wood of the tree is used in Cambodia for internal work timber in construction and is often collected for firewood. It is a source of wood and charcoal in Bhutan. On the Indian subcontent, the wood is used in construction (including houses), for tea-boxes and for charcoal, the fruit is eaten, and the nuts are used for bracelets, necklaces and rosaries. Amongst inhabitants of Neora Valley National Park, West Bengal, the fruit is consumed cooked, and is sometimes used for the remission of high blood pressure. Nepalese use the wood for charcoal and eat the fruit.

Mearnsetin is an O-methylated flavonol that can be found in E. lanceofolius.

== History ==
The tree was first described by William Roxburgh in his 1814 Hortus Bengalensis, or a Catalogue of the Plants Growing in the Honourable East India Company's Botanical Garden at Calcutta. Serampore, for what was the East India Company's Botanical Garden at Calcutta, now Acharya Jagadish Chandra Bose Indian Botanic Garden in Kolkata.

== Literature ==
Additional information can be found in the following:

- Dy Phon, P. (2000). Dictionnaire des plantes utilisées au Cambodge: 1–915. chez l'auteur, Phnom Penh, Cambodia.
- Govaerts, R. (2001). World Checklist of Seed Plants Database in ACCESS E-F: 1–50919.
- Grierson, A.J.C. & Long, D.G. (2001). Flora of Bhutan 2: 1–1675. Royal Botanic Gardens, Edinburgh.
- Kress, W.J., DeFilipps, R.A., Farr, E. & Kyi, D.Y.Y. (2003). A Checklist of the Trees, Shrubs, Herbs and Climbers of Myanmar Contributions from the United States National Herbarium 45: 1–590. Smithsonian Institution.
- Lê, T.C. (2005). Danh lục các loài thục vật Việt Nam [Checklist of Plant Species of Vietnam] 3: 1–1248. Hà Noi : Nhà xu?t b?n Nông nghi?p.
- Mostaph, M.K. & Uddin, S.B. (2013). Dictionary of plant names of Bangladesh, Vasc. Pl.: 1–434. Janokalyan Prokashani, Chittagong, Bangladesh.
- Murti, S. K. 1993. Family Elaeocarpaceae in India - Census and observations. J. Econ. Taxon. Bot. 17:289. Note: lists as "lancifolius"
- Newman, M., Ketphanh, S., Svengsuksa, B., Thomas, P., Sengdala, K., Lamxay, V. & Armstrong, K. (2007). A checklist of the vascular plants of Lao PDR: 1–394. Royal Botanic Gardens, Edinburgh.
- Smitinand, T. & K. Larsen, eds. 1970-. Flora of Thailand.
- Wu, Z., Raven, P.H. & Hong, D. (eds.) (2007). Flora of China 12: 1–534. Science Press (Beijing) & Missouri Botanical Garden Press (St. Louis).
