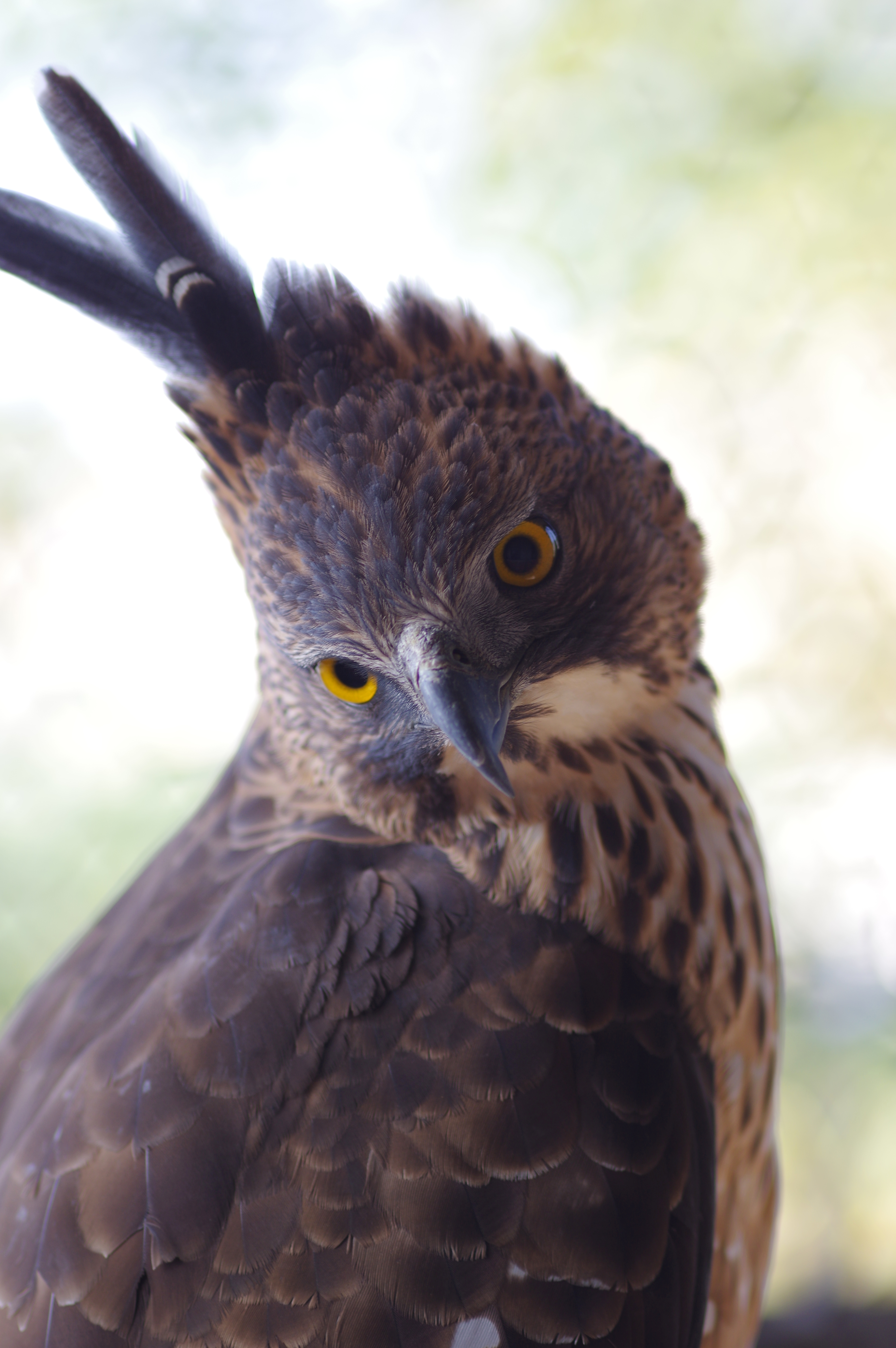
- A captive adult
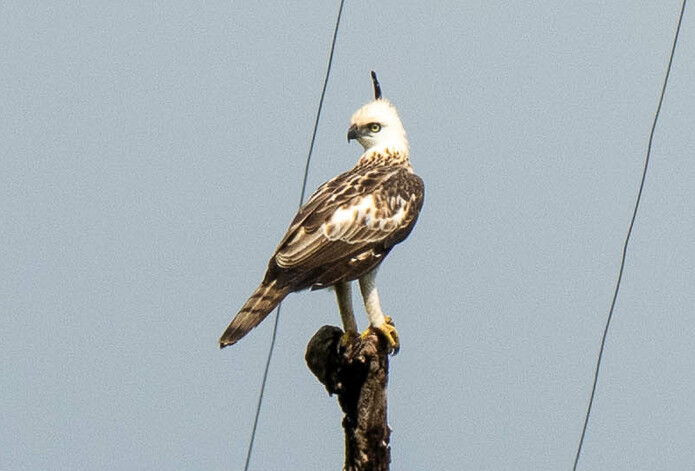
- A wild juvenile Pinsker's hawk-eagle seen in Davao de Oro

Conservation status
- Endangered (IUCN 3.1)

Scientific classification
- Kingdom: Animalia
- Phylum: Chordata
- Class: Aves
- Order: Accipitriformes
- Family: Accipitridae
- Genus: Nisaetus
- Species: N. pinskeri

Binomial name
- Nisaetus pinskeri (Preleuthner & Gamauf, 1998)

Synonyms
- Spizaetus philippensis pinskeri Preleuthner & Gamauf, 1998

= Pinsker's hawk-eagle =

Species of bird

Pinsker's hawk-eagle (Nisaetus pinskeri), south Philippine hawk-eagle or Mindanao hawk-eagle, is an endangered species of bird of prey in the family Accipitridae. It is endemic to the Philippines native to the islands of Leyte, Samar, Negros, Basilan, Bohol and Mindanao. It is found in primary moist lowland forest and tropical moist montane forest up to 1,900 m. It is threatened by habitat loss and hunting.

== Description and taxonomy ==
It is most closely related to the Philippine hawk-eagle (Nisaetus philipensis) with some taxonomists still considering it a subspecies, and Changeable hawk-eagle (Nisaetus cirrhatus) which is commonly distributed in Southeast Asia.

It was formerly conspecific with the Philippine hawk-eagle but has a longer crest, smaller size, gray plumage and heavily barred belly and legs. This split was supported by molecular analysis.

This species is monotypic and has no subspecies.

== Ecology and behavior ==
Not much information of its diet in the wild but believed to feed mostly on birds. It perches high up in the cannopy but is mostly seen at forest edge or soaring over the forest.

Based on unpublished data collected by the curators taking care of a captive Pinsker's hawk in Philippine Eagle Conservation Center (Philippine Eagle Foundation), every breeding season the natural pair hawk eagles produces one egg. The incubation takes 47 days, relatively close with the Javan hawk-eagle, in some irregular cases, 49 days is the longest ever recorded. Unlike the Philippine eagle which is naturally producing one egg in every two years, the N. pinskeri lays egg every year. The pair rare the young up to five months even in captivity.

After five months the fledgling stage takes place. During this time, the parent hawk eagles will intentionally stop delivering the food within the nest platform, instead to the nearest branch and eventually to the distanced branches to encourage the young for branching and flying in short distances. After flight training the parent hawk eagles will push the young for dispersal and look for its own niche.

Still in captivity, during incubation period only the female hawk eagle will brood the egg. The role of the male is to deliver food to the nest. However, the nest building and nest material collection is a sole responsibility of male. The curators will introduce different kind of twigs and leaves coming from the native tree species in the Malagos watershed. The male eagle will then choose the best material for nest building.

In captivity, copulation takes place four times every day and breeding season starts in early September to October and approximately courtship begun by March.

== Habitat and conservation Status ==
This species is found in both tropical moist lowland forest and tropical moist montane forest up to 1,900 meters above sea level.

The Pinsker's Hawk-Eagle is listed as Endangered species (IUCN status) with estimates of 1,300-3,600 mature individuals remaining, as of 2024. They are mainly threatened by habitat loss, hunting and trapping for the pet trade.

It is found in a few protected areas including Rajah Sikatuna Protected Landscape, Mount Kanlaon, Pasonanca Natural Park, Mount Apo, Mount Kitanglad, Mount Hamiguitan, Mount Malindang, Samar Island Natural Park and Balinsasayao Twin Lakes Natural Park but actual protection from deforestation is still lax.
