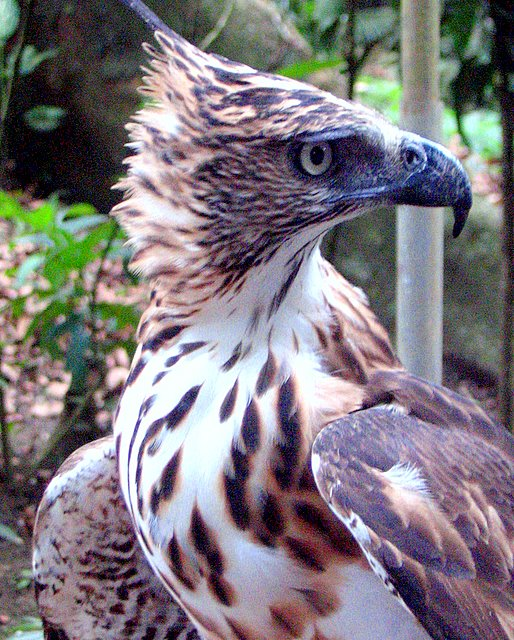

Conservation status
- Endangered (IUCN 3.1)

Scientific classification
- Kingdom: Animalia
- Phylum: Chordata
- Class: Aves
- Order: Accipitriformes
- Family: Accipitridae
- Genus: Nisaetus
- Species: N. philippensis

Binomial name
- Nisaetus philippensis (Gould, 1863)

Synonyms
- Spizaetus philippensis

= Philippine hawk-eagle =

Species of bird

The Philippine hawk-eagle or north Philippine hawk-eagle (Nisaetus philippensis), earlier treated under Spizaetus, is a species of bird of prey in the family Accipitridae. Many taxonomists consider the Pinsker's hawk-eagle, a former subspecies, raised to full species status. It is endemic to the Philippines. Its natural habitat is tropical moist lowland forests. It is threatened by habitat loss and trapping.

== Description and taxonomy ==
The Philippine hawk-eagle is a large raptor with a dark brown upper plumage and a pale brown belly. Head and chest are streaked and the lower belly is finely barred. The species has a conspicuous backwards crest. Juveniles are paler. The call a high, screeching "week wik!" or single "week!".

It was formerly conspecific with the Pinsker's hawk-eagle but has a shorter crest, larger size, browner plummage and plain markings on the belly. This split was supported by molecular analysis.

In terms of size, it is a smaller eagle with a length of 56 to 67 cm, and a wingspan of 105 to 125 cm. One female weighed 1.16 kg.

This species is monotypic and has no subspecies.

== Ecology and behavior ==
The first comprehensive study was conducted of a nesting pair in Rizal in 2020. This nest was livestreamed daily on Facebook. This breeding pair nested in a Bombax ceiba tree in secondary forest with a territory spanning 3.3 square kilometers.

Not much information of its diet in the wild but believed to feed mostly on birds and small mammals. The nest in 2020 revealed the diet to consist of 35% birds, 32% mammals, 6% reptiles and the remaining 27% to be unknown. It perches high up in the cannopy but is mostly seen at forest edge or soaring over the forest.

Incubation took approximately 3 weeks, in the first to third week the body size doubled every week. In the 4th to 7th week, the development of the feathers and juvenile plummage was observed. Fledging took approximately two months.

== Conservation status ==
It inhabits primary and secondary forest, occasionally frequenting clearings and cultivations, from the lowlands to lower mountain slopes. The majority of records are below 1,000 meters above sea level.

The IUCN Red List has assessed this bird as endangered with the population being estimated at 1,000 to 2,000 mature individuals as of 2024, continuing to decrease. This figure is based on the estimate of a pair per 17.5 square kilometers, however, the 2020 study of a nesting pair revealed a territory of just 3.3 square kilometers and thus, this estimate may need to be revised with further study.

This species' main threat is habitat loss with wholesale clearance of forest habitats as a result of logging, agricultural conversion and mining activities occurring within the range. It is also trapped and hunted for food and the pet trade.

It occurs in a few protected areas including Mt. Makiling National Park, Mount Isarog National Park, Kalbario–Patapat Natural Park, Northern Sierra Madre Natural Park and Bataan National Park. However, as is the case for most of the Philippines protection and enforcement from logging and hunting is lax.

Conservation actions proposed include to surveys in area from which the species is known and propose formal protection. Study the species's ecology, particularly home-range size and dispersal ability to help inform a global population estimate and assess the likely impact of habitat fragmentation. Promote more effective enforcement of legislation designed to control hunting and trading. Assess forest loss in the Philippines and gauge the species's likely rate of decline and degree of fragmentation of its populations. Research hunting and trade by interviewing local people and visiting wildlife markets.

The Wild Bird Club of the Philippines published a children's storybook named Bagwis. This story was inspired from same nesting pair studied in Rizal. The story is about a poacher capturing a chick and how citizens united to return this chick to its parents. This story was shown on GMA Network and is read in public events to increase awareness of this bird and to push back on poaching
