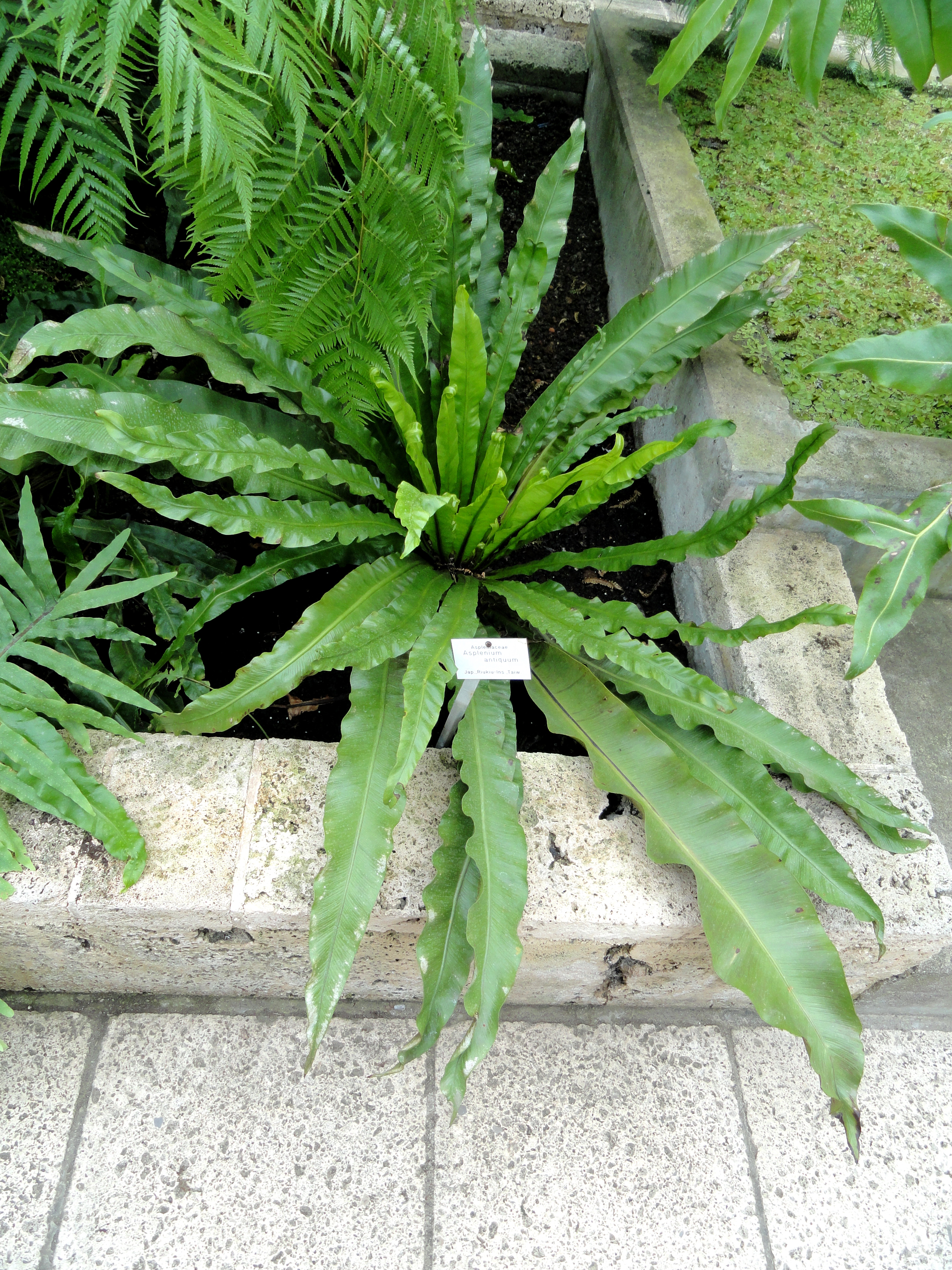

Scientific classification
- Kingdom: Plantae
- Clade: Embryophytes
- Clade: Tracheophytes
- Division: Polypodiophyta
- Class: Polypodiopsida
- Order: Polypodiales
- Suborder: Aspleniineae
- Family: Aspleniaceae
- Genus: Asplenium
- Species: A. antiquum

Binomial name
- Asplenium antiquum Makino

Synonyms
- Neottopteris antiqua (Makino) Masam.; Thamnopteris antiquum (Makino) Makino

= Asplenium antiquum =

Species of fern in the spleenwort family

Asplenium antiquum is a species of fern in the family Aspleniaceae. It is sometimes referred to as Japanese Bird's Nest Fern or simply Bird's Nest Fern. In Japanese, it is known by ō-tani-watari and tani-watari. It grows on cliffs, logs and rocks, near waterfalls, in damp forests, and on tree trunks in southeastern China, Japan, Korea, and Taiwan. It is classified as an endangered species in both South Korea and Japan.

== Description ==
Asplenium antiquum is an evergreen fern, 2–3 ft. (60–90 cm). It has bright green, arching blades with a pointed end and a strong midrib. Asplenium antiquum can readily be distinguished from the closely related Asplenium nidus by its fronds of uniform width.

=== Chemical composition ===
Mearnsetin 3,7-dirhamnoside, a glycoside of the flavonol mearnsetin, can be found in A. antiquum.

== Taxonomy ==
A global phylogeny of Asplenium published in 2020 divided the genus into eleven clades, which were given informal names pending further taxonomic study. A. antiquum belongs to the "Neottopteris clade", members of which generally have somewhat leathery leaf tissue. While the subclades of this group are poorly resolved, several of them share a characteristic "bird's-nest fern" morphology with entire leaves and fused veins near the margin. A. antiquum belongs to one of these subclades, together with A. antrophyoides, A. cymbifolium, A. humbertii, and A. phyllitidis. Other bird's-nest ferns, such as A. nidus sensu lato and A. australasicum, form a separate subclade which is not particularly closely related.

== Distribution ==
A. antiquum is native to temperate and subtropical East Asia, being found in southeastern China, Japan, South Korea, and Taiwan, where it grows on rock faces, cliffside outcroppings, and tree branches and trunks. It is classed as an IUCN endangered species in its native habitat in Japan and South Korea.

== Cultivation ==
Despite its endangered status in Japan and South Korea, Asplenium antiquum is a fairly common ornamental plant within the nursery trade, widely sold throughout Asia, Australia, Europe, and North and South America. This species may be grown outdoors all year-round in certain temperate and subtropical climates (for example, in sheltered, ventilated areas within USDA hardiness zones 9 and 10); elsewhere, it may live outside from approximately May through October (in the northern hemisphere; about October to March in the southern). However, it must be protected or brought-inside as a house plant when frost is a risk, or when nighttime temperatures drop below 40 °F (4.4 °C). It requires fairly consistent, high humidity—albeit without being so saturated as to induce rot. The ideal substrate should be aerated and well-draining, such as sphagnum moss, while still feeling like a damp, wrung-out sponge. Keep out of direct sunlight while still providing bright, indirect light. A. antiquum does best in a well ventilated but comfortable greenhouse or terrarium setup, if grown indoors, and thrives in semi-hydroponics.

Some commonly available cultivars and forms in the plant trade include:

- Asplenium antiquum 'Crissie'
- 'Hurricane'
- 'Leslie'
- 'Osaka'
- 'Victoria'

== Sources ==
- Xu, Ke-Wang; Zhang, Liang; Rothfels, Carl J.; Smith, Alan R.; Viane, Ronald; Lorence, David; Wood, Kenneth R.; Chen, Cheng-Wei; Knapp, Ralf; Zhou, Lin; Lu, Ngan Thi; Zhou, Xin-Mao; Wei, Hong-Jin; Fan, Qiang; Chen, Su-Fang; Cicuzza, Daniele; Gao, Xin-Fen; Li, Wen-Bo; Zhang, Li-Bing (2020). "A global plastid phylogeny of the fern genus Asplenium (Aspleniaceae)". Cladistics. 36 (1): 22–71. doi:10.1111/cla.12384. PMID 34618950. S2CID 201197385.
