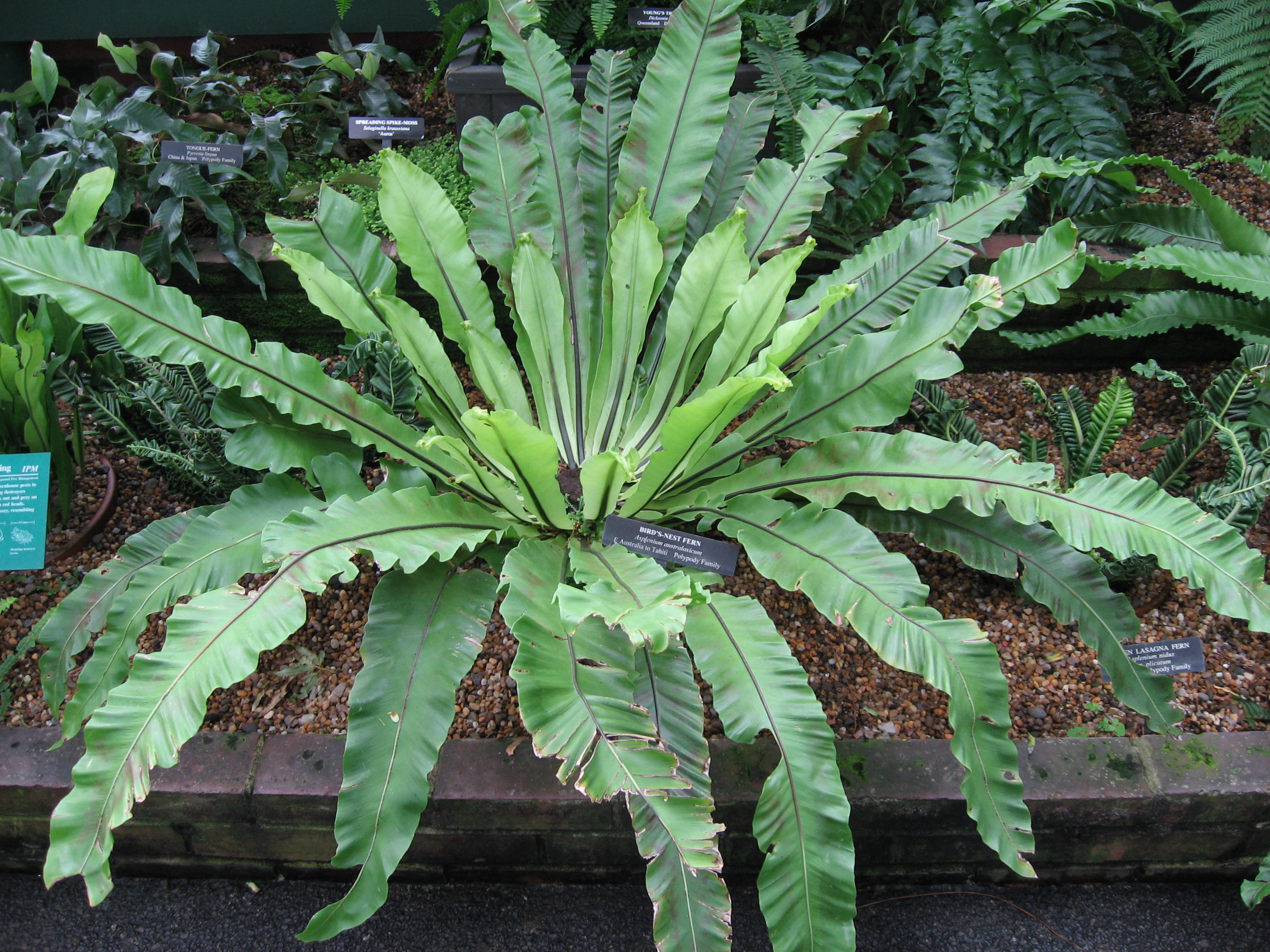

Scientific classification
- Kingdom: Plantae
- Clade: Tracheophytes
- Division: Polypodiophyta
- Class: Polypodiopsida
- Order: Polypodiales
- Suborder: Aspleniineae
- Family: Aspleniaceae
- Genus: Asplenium
- Species: A. australasicum

Binomial name
- Asplenium australasicum (J.Sm.) Hook.

= Asplenium australasicum =

Species of fern in the spleenwort family

Asplenium australasicum, the bird's nest fern or crow's nest fern, is an epiphytic Australasian species of fern in the family Aspleniaceae.

== Taxonomy ==
Asplenium australasicum was originally described by English botanist John Smith in 1857 as Neottopteris australasica. He had reclassified the already known A. nidus in its own genus Neottopteris. Other botanists reclassified the genus as a section, Thamnopteris, within the genus Asplenium, and William Jackson Hooker gave it its current binomial name in 1859. Although the section Thamnopteris is distinctive, defining the species has been difficult as the morphology of the plants is so simple. A. australasicum has been confused with (and called) A. nidus, and Japanese populations which were considered to be A. australasicum by their morphology have been found to be genetically distinct and reclassified as a new species, A. setoi.

A global phylogeny of Asplenium published in 2020 divided the genus into eleven clades, which were given informal names pending further taxonomic study. A. australasicum belongs to the "Neottopteris clade", members of which generally have somewhat leathery leaf tissue. While the subclades of this group are poorly resolved, several of them share a characteristic "bird's-nest fern" morphology with entire leaves and fused veins near the margin. Both the 2020 study and a 2015 molecular study found that A. australasicum is polyphyletic, meaning that some populations were not closely related to others—A. australasicum from Fiji and Vanauatu were not closely related to A. australasicum from Australia and New Caledonia. Hence a revision with sampling of the species across its range was required to delineate the taxon and identify cryptic species. A. australasicum forms a clade with the morphologically similar A. nidus sensu lato, but other bird's-nest ferns such as A. antiquum and A. phyllitidis form a separate subclade which is not particularly closely related.

== Description ==
Asplenium australasicum grows as shrubby plant, with a rosette of yellow-green fronds which are 60 to 80 cm (24–32 in) long and 3 to 21 cm (1.2–8.4 in) wide. It can be distinguished from A. nidus by its prominent midrib under its fronds, giving the fronds a keeled appearance. The spores form in parallel lines which run in parallel with the veins and oblique to the midrib.

== Distribution and habitat ==
A. australasicum grows on rocks or as an epiphyte on trees and is native to eastern New South Wales and Queensland. The clumps can reach a large size, with the centre of the fern acting as a reservoir for debris. The colonial botanist William Woolls wrote "... as a caution to fern gatherers, sometimes a species of black snake coils itself up in the centre" (of the birds nest fern).

== Cultivation ==
Asplenium australasicum specimens were taken from logged areas, which helped them become popular in horticulture. It adapts readily to cultivation, as long as it has good drainage. Poor drainage renders it vulnerable to rotting. It can be grown in a tub or barrel. In cultivation it is occasionally attacked by white coconut scale on the underside of the fronds.

== Uses ==
Apart from its use as an ornamental plant, bird's nest fern is also a popular vegetable in Taiwan, particularly in the Eastern part of the island, where the young emerging fronds of both A. australasicum and A. nidus are used as a leafy vegetable, from either wild or cultivated plants.
