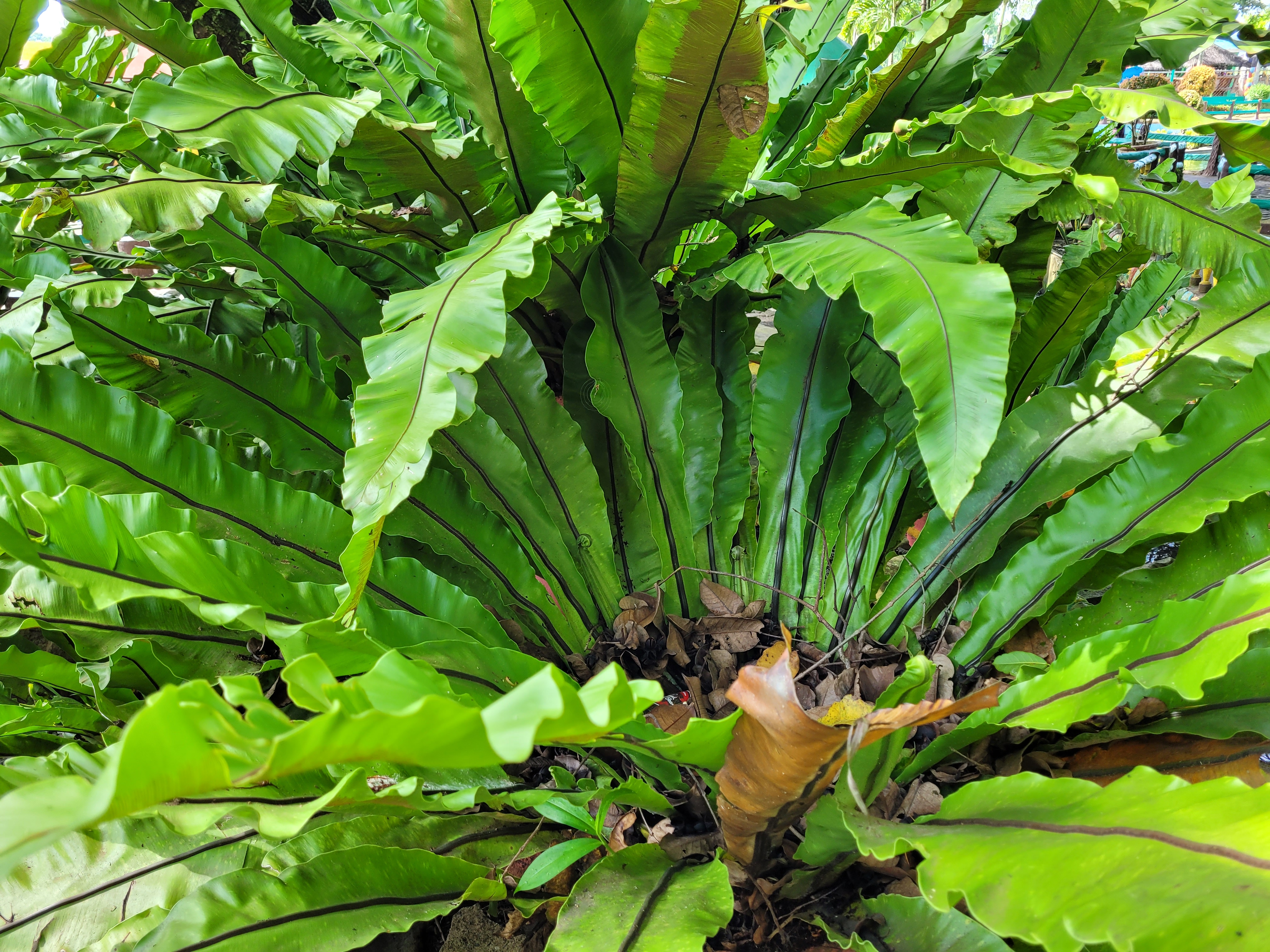
- Asplenium nidus in the Philippines

Conservation status
- Secure (NatureServe)

Scientific classification
- Kingdom: Plantae
- Clade: Tracheophytes
- Division: Polypodiophyta
- Class: Polypodiopsida
- Order: Polypodiales
- Suborder: Aspleniineae
- Family: Aspleniaceae
- Genus: Asplenium
- Species: A. nidus

Binomial name
- Asplenium nidus L.

Synonyms
- Asplenium antiquum Makino; A. australasicum (J.Sm.) Hook.; A. ficifolium Goldm.; Neottopteris mauritiana Fée; N. musaefolia J.Sm.; N. nidus (L.) J.Sm.; N. rigida Fée; Thamnopteris nidus (L.) C.Presl

= Asplenium nidus =

Species of fern in the spleenwort family

Asplenium nidus is an epiphytic species of fern in the family Aspleniaceae, native to tropical southeastern Asia, eastern Australia, Hawaii (ʻēkaha in Hawaiian), Polynesia, Christmas Island, India, and eastern Africa. It is known by the common names bird's-nest fern (a name shared by some other aspleniums) or simply nest fern.

== Description ==
Asplenium nidus forms large simple fronds visually similar to banana leaves, with the fronds growing to 50–150 centimetres (20–59 in) long and 10–20 centimetres (3.9–7.9 in) broad, with occasional individuals up to 200 cm (79 in) long by up to 60 cm (24 in) wide. They are light green, often crinkled, with a black midrib, and exhibit circinate vernation. Spores develop in sori on the underside of the fronds. These sori form long rows extending out from the midrib on the back of the outer part of the lamina (frond). The fronds roll back as they brown and create a massive leaf nest in the branches and trunks of trees. Some plants in the Philippines have fronds up to 135 cm (53 in) long while only 3.7 cm (1.5 in) wide.

== Taxonomy ==
Linnaeus was the first to describe bird's-nest fern with the binomial Asplenium nidus in his Species Plantarum of 1753.

A global phylogeny of Asplenium published in 2020 divided the genus into eleven clades, which were given informal names pending further taxonomic study. A. nidus belongs to the "Neottopteris clade", members of which generally have somewhat leathery leaf tissue. While the subclades of this group are poorly resolved, several of them share a characteristic "bird's-nest fern" morphology with entire leaves and fused veins near the margin. Both the 2020 study and a 2015 molecular study found that A. nidus is polyphyletic, meaning that some populations were not closely related to others—A. nidus from Madagascar, Vanuatu and New Guinea were more closely related to other species than each other. Hence a revision with sampling of the species across its range was required to delineate the taxon and identify cryptic species. A. nidus sensu lato forms a clade with the morphologically similar A. australasicum, but other bird's-nest ferns such as A. antiquum and A. phyllitidis form a separate subclade which is not particularly closely related.

== Native distribution ==
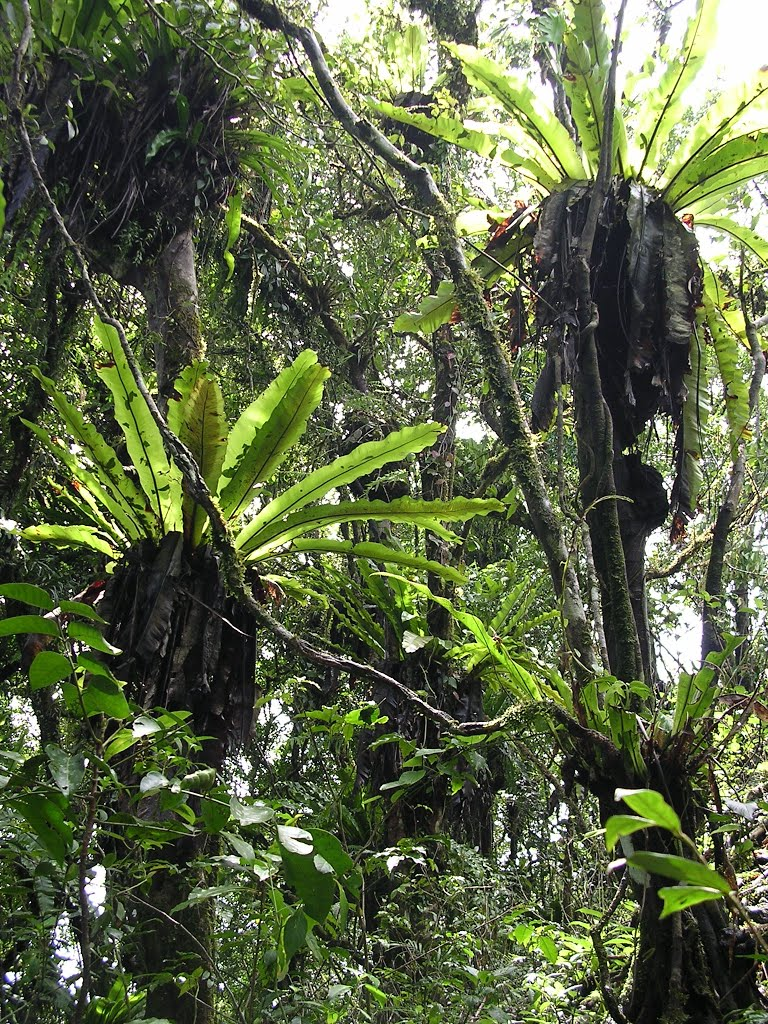
Bird's nest ferns in tropical montane forest on Mount Manucoco, Atauro Island, East Timor

Asplenium nidus is native to east tropical Africa (in Tanzania, inclusive of the Zanzibar Archipelago); temperate and tropical Asia (in Indonesia; East Timor; the island of Kyushu, and the Ryukyu Islands of Japan; Malaysia; the Philippines; Taiwan; and Thailand); and in northern Australia, Queensland and the Pacific Islands.

== Habitat ==
Asplenium nidus can survive either as an epiphyte or terrestrial plant, but typically grows on organic matter. This fern often lives in palm trees, where it collects water and humus in its leaf-rosette. It thrives in warm, humid areas in partial to full shade. It dislikes direct sunlight and likes to be in full shade on a south facing garden wall when in the southern hemisphere and the north facing in the northern hemisphere.

== Uses ==
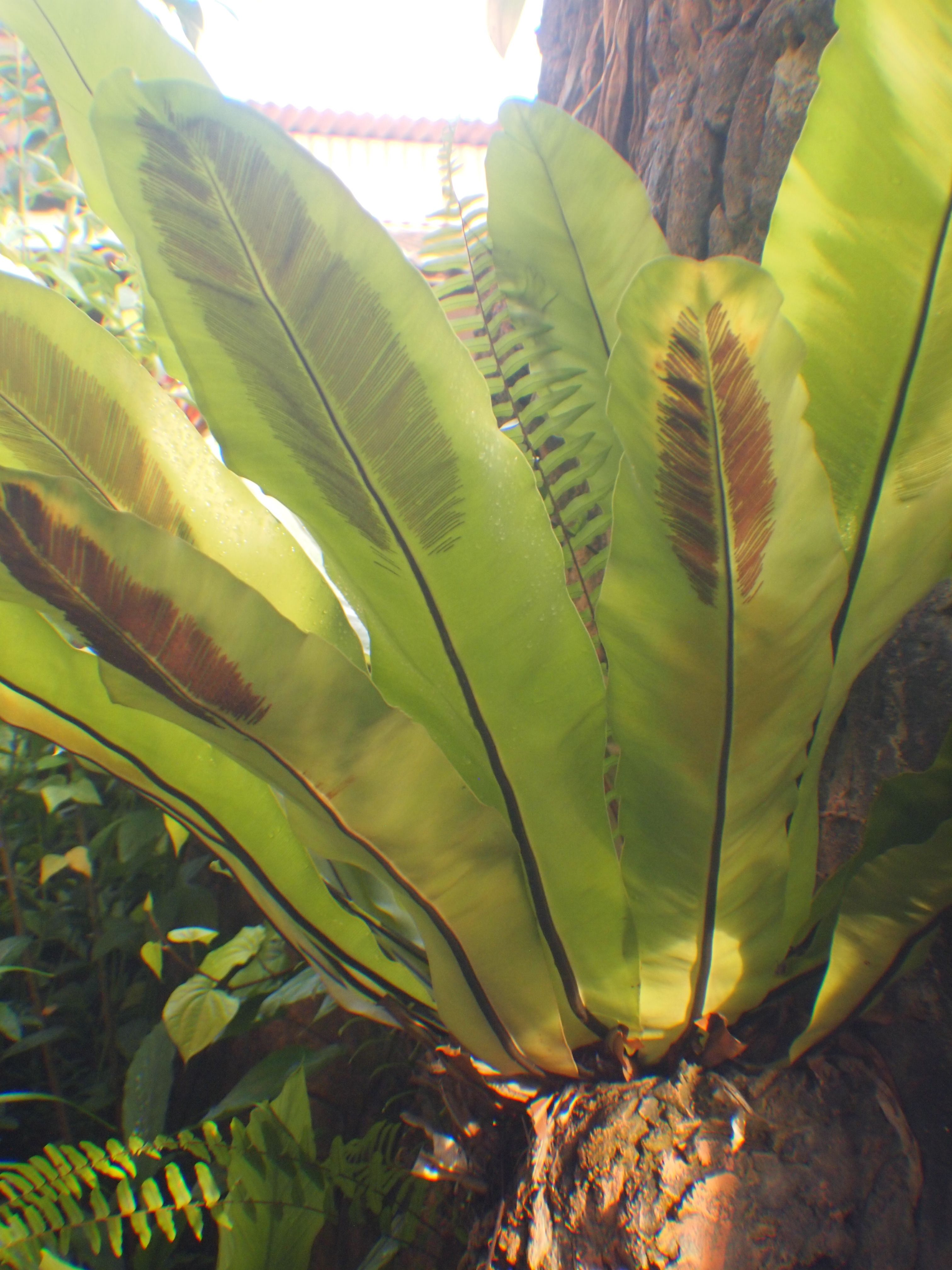
Asplenium nidus in Malaysia

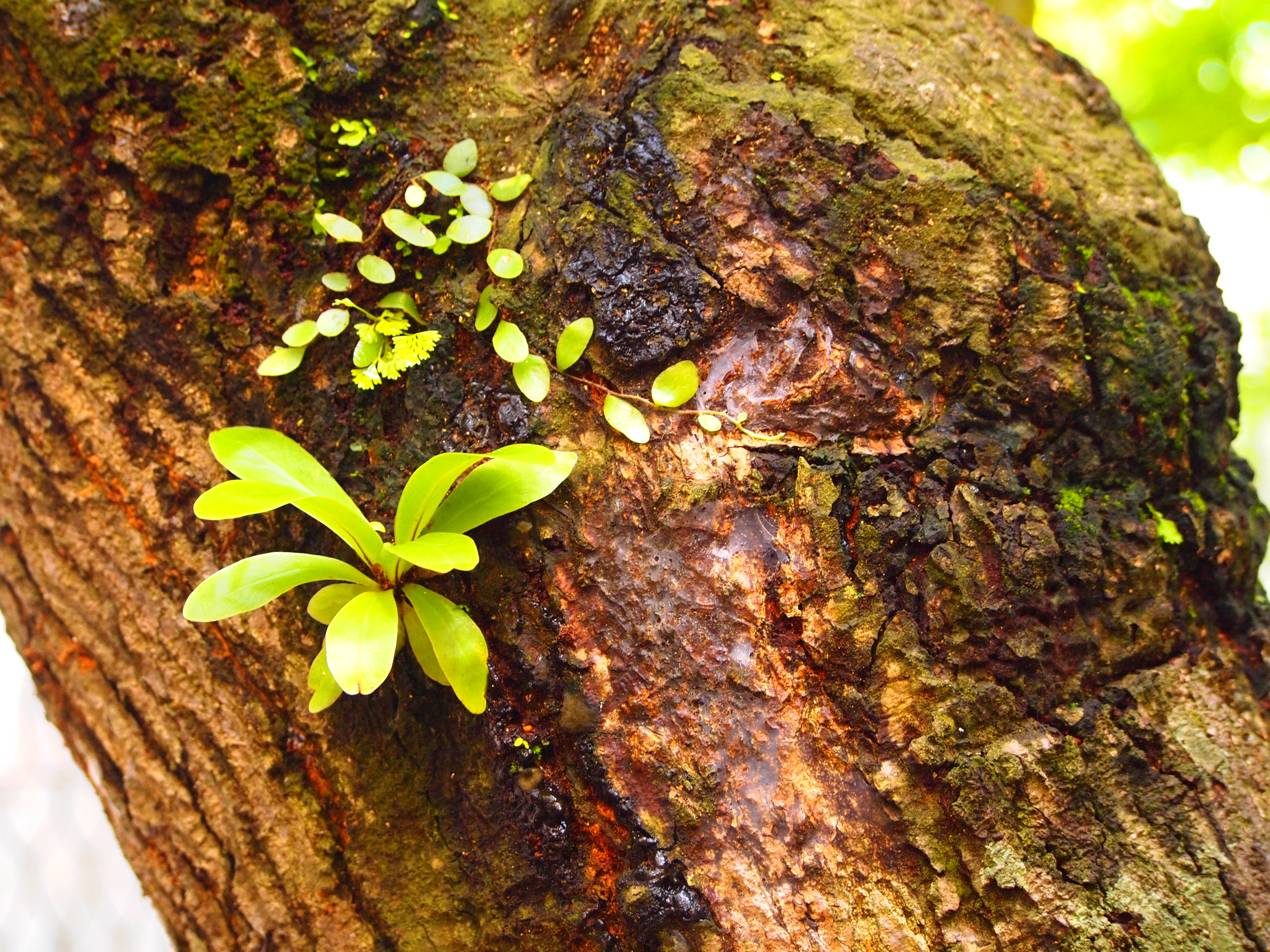
A small Asplenium nidus and Pyrrosia growing on a tree trunk

With a minimum temperature of 10 °C (50 °F), Asplenium nidus is widely cultivated in temperate regions as a houseplant. However, many plants sold as A. nidus are actually the related Asplenium australasicum. Asplenium nidus has gained the Royal Horticultural Society's Award of Garden Merit.

Asplenium nidus has been used locally in folk medicine for asthma, sores, weakness, and halitosis.

The sprouts of A. nidus are eaten in Taiwan, known as 山蘇, pronounced shansu. (山 meaning "mountain", as in mountain vegetables). They may be stir-fried or boiled and are a traditional aboriginal vegetable, now popular enough to appear even on the menus of chain restaurants.

The young fronds are eaten in the Polynesian islands, known as Luku in Niue, Laukatafa in Tuvalu and Laumea in Tokelau where it is often cooked together and eaten with coconut cream. The large fronds are also used in the wrapping and cooking of food.

== Protection ==
In Hong Kong, this species is under protection based on Forestry Regulations Cap. 96A.
