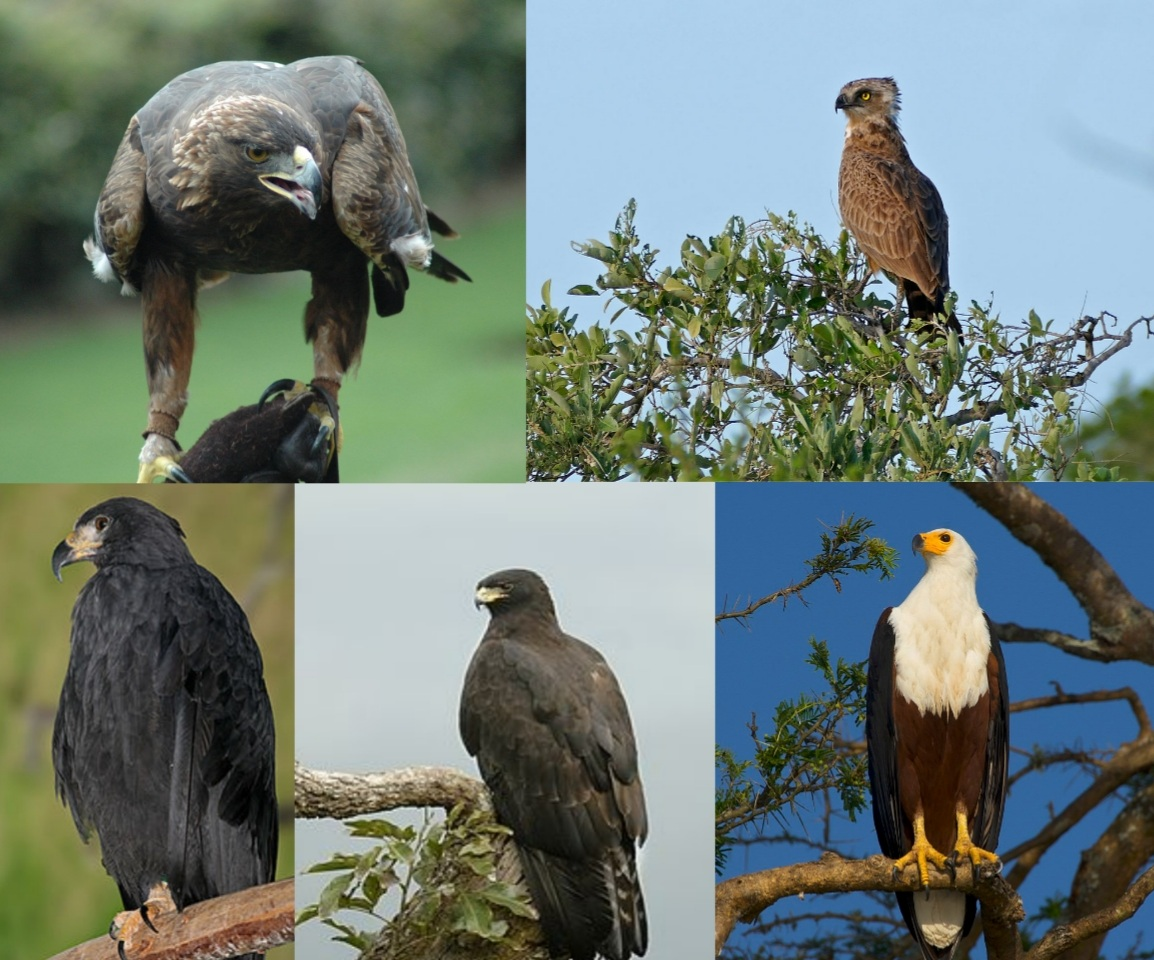
- From left to right, top row first: golden eagle (Aquila chrysaetos), brown snake eagle (Circaetus cinereus), solitary eagle (Buteogallus solitarius), black eagle (Ictinaetus malaiensis) and African fish eagle (Icthyophaga vocifer).

Scientific classification
- Kingdom: Animalia
- Phylum: Chordata
- Class: Aves
- Order: Accipitriformes
- Family: Accipitridae

Species
- See text

= Eagle =

Large bird of prey

Eagle is the common name for certain large predatory birds of prey within the family of the Accipitridae. While on a genetic level, only the subfamily Aquilinae comprises "true eagles", many other species are commonly referred to as eagles, such as the bald eagle, and the term generally carries no taxonomic weight. Most of the 68 species of eagles are from Eurasia and Africa. Outside this area, just 14 species can be found—two in North America, nine in Central and South America, and three in Australia.

Eagles are not a natural group but denote essentially any kind of bird of prey large enough to hunt sizeable (about 50 cm long or more overall) vertebrates.

== Etymology ==
The word "eagle" is borrowed into English from Old French aigle, ultimately from Latin aquila. It is cognate with terms such as French aigle, Portuguese águia and Spanish águila. Historically, the native English term for eagle was "ern" (Old English: earn), derived from Proto-Germanic *arnuz, and thus cognate with other synonymous words in Germanic languages such as German Aar, Dutch arend, Swedish örn and Gothic 𐌰𐍂𐌰 (ara). The term "ern" or "erne" is still used in Modern English in reference to some larger species of eagle, in particular the fish eagles. While some ornithologists may favor this term as a way to distinguish fish eagles from true eagles, all species of fish eagle (such as the bald eagle and white-tailed eagle) are still commonly referred to as "eagles".

== Description ==
Eagles are large, powerfully-built birds of prey, with heavy heads and beaks. Even the smallest eagles, such as the booted eagle (Hieraaetus pennatus), which is comparable in size to a common buzzard (Buteo buteo) or red-tailed hawk (B. jamaicensis), have relatively longer and more evenly broad wings, and more direct, faster flight, despite the reduced size of their aerodynamic feathers. Most eagles are larger than any other raptors, apart from some vultures. The smallest species of eagle is the Great Nicobar serpent eagle (Spilornis klossi), at 450 g (1 lb) and 40 cm (16 in). The largest species are discussed below. Like all birds of prey, eagles have very large hooked beaks for ripping flesh from their prey, strong, muscular legs, and powerful talons.

The beak is typically heavier than that of most other birds of prey. Eagles' eyes are extremely powerful. It is estimated that the wedge-tailed eagle has a visual acuity twice that of a typical human. This acuity enables eagles to spot potential prey from a very long distance. This keen eyesight is primarily attributed to their extremely large pupils which ensure minimal diffraction (scattering) of the incoming light. Like most diurnal raptors, eagles have little ability to see ultraviolet light. The female of all known species of eagles is larger than the male.

Eagles normally build their nests, called eyries, in tall trees or on high cliffs. Many species lay two eggs, but the older, larger chick frequently kills its younger sibling once it has hatched. The parents take no action to stop the killing. It is said that eagles fly above clouds but this is not true. Eagles fly during storms and glide from the wind's pressure. This saves the bird's energy. Due to the size and power of many eagle species, they are ranked at the top of the food chain as apex predators in the avian world. The type of prey varies by genus. The Haliaeetus and Icthyophaga eagles prefer to capture fish, though the species in the former often capture various animals, especially other water birds, and are powerful kleptoparasites of other birds. The snake and serpent eagles of the genera Circaetus, Terathopius, and Spilornis predominantly prey on the great diversity of snakes found in the tropics of Africa and Asia. The eagles of the genus Aquila are often the top birds of prey in open habitats, taking almost any medium-sized vertebrate they can catch. Where Aquila eagles are absent, other eagles, such as the buteonine black-chested buzzard-eagle of South America, may assume the position of top raptorial predator in open areas. Many other eagles, including the species-rich genus Spizaetus, live predominantly in woodlands and forests. These eagles often target various arboreal or ground-dwelling mammals and birds, which are often unsuspectingly ambushed in such dense, knotty environments. Hunting techniques differ among the species and genera, with some individual eagles having engaged in quite varied techniques based on their environment and prey at any given time. Most eagles grab prey without landing and take flight with it, so the prey can be carried to a perch and torn apart.

The bald eagle is noted for having flown with the heaviest load verified to be carried by any flying bird, since one eagle flew with a 6.8 kg (15 lb) mule deer fawn. However, a few eagles may target prey considerably heavier than themselves; such prey is too heavy to fly with, thus it is either eaten at the site of the kill or taken in pieces back to a perch or nest. Golden and crowned eagles have killed ungulates weighing up to 30 kg (66 lb) and a martial eagle even killed a 37 kg (82 lb) duiker, 7–8 times heavier than the preying eagle. Authors on birds David Allen Sibley, Pete Dunne, and Clay Sutton described the behavioral difference between hunting eagles and other birds of prey thus (in this case the bald and golden eagles as compared to other North American raptors):

An Eagle named in honor of Abraham Lincoln and was the mascot of 8th Wisconsin Infantry Regiment, at the time of the U.S. Centennial

They have at least one singular characteristic. It has been observed that most birds of prey look back over their shoulders before striking prey (or shortly thereafter); predation is after all a two-edged sword. All hawks seem to have this habit, from the smallest kestrel to the largest Ferruginous – but not the Eagles.

Among the eagles are some of the largest birds of prey: only the condors and some of the Old World vultures are markedly larger. It is regularly debated which should be considered the largest species of eagle. They could be measured variously in total length, body mass, or wingspan. Different lifestyle needs among various eagles result in variable measurements from species to species. For example, many forest-dwelling eagles, including the very large harpy eagle, have relatively short wingspans, a feature necessary for being able to maneuver in quick, short bursts through densely forested habitats. Eagles in the genus Aquila, found almost exclusively in open country, are noted for their ability to soar, and have relatively long wings for their size.

These lists of the top five eagles are based on weight, length, and wingspan, respectively. Unless otherwise noted by reference, the figures listed are the median reported for each measurement in the guide Raptors of the World in which only measurements that could be personally verified by the authors were listed.

| Rank | Common name | Scientific name | Body mass |
|---|---|---|---|
| 1 | Steller's sea eagle | Haliaeetus pelagicus | 6.95 kg (15 1/4 lb) (Average Weight) |
| 2 | Harpy eagle | Harpia harpyja | 6.5 kg (14 1/4 lb) (Average Weight) |
| 3 | Philippine eagle | Pithecophaga jefferyi | 6.35 kg (14 lb) (Average Weight) |
| 4 | White-tailed eagle | Haliaeetus albicilla | 4.8 kg (10 1/2 lb) (Average Weight) |
| 5 | Martial eagle | Polemaetus bellicosus | 4.6 kg (10 1/4 lb) (Average Weight) |

| Rank | Common name | Scientific name | Total length |
|---|---|---|---|
| 1 | Philippine eagle | Pithecophaga jefferyi | 100 cm (3 ft 3 in) |
| 2 | Harpy eagle | Harpia harpyja | 98.5 cm (3 ft 3 in) |
| 3 | Wedge-tailed eagle | Aquila audax | 95.5 cm (3 ft 2 in) |
| 4 | Steller's sea eagle | Haliaeetus pelagicus | 95 cm (3 ft 1 in) |
| 5 | Crowned eagle | Stephanoaetus coronatus | 87.5 cm (2 ft 10 in) |

| Rank | Common name | Scientific name | Median wingspan |
|---|---|---|---|
| 1 | White-tailed eagle | Haliaeetus albicilla | 218.5 cm (7 ft 2 in) |
| 2 | Steller's sea eagle | Haliaeetus pelagicus | 212.5 cm (7 ft 0 in) |
| 3 | Wedge-tailed eagle | Aquila audax | 210 cm (6 ft 11 in) |
| 4 | Golden eagle | Aquila chrysaetos | 207 cm (6 ft 9 in) |
| 5 | Martial eagle | Polemaetus bellicosus | 206.5 cm (6 ft 9 in) |

== Habitat ==
The eagles are generally distributed in all types of habitats and nearly all parts of the world. The birds can be found in northern tundra to tropical rainforests and deserts. In North America, bald eagles and golden eagles are very common.

== Distribution ==
- Australasian
  - Australia: wedge-tailed eagle (range extends into southern New Guinea), white-bellied sea-eagle (range extends into Asia), little eagle.
  - New Guinea: Papuan eagle, white-bellied sea-eagle, pygmy eagle.
- Nearctic (USA and Canada): golden eagle (also found in Palearctic), bald eagle.
- Neotropical (Central and South America): Spizaetus (four species), solitary eagles (two spp.), harpy eagle, crested eagle, black-chested buzzard-eagle.
- Palearctic (Europe, Northern Africa, Asia without South Asia and Southeast Asia)
  - Eurasia: Golden eagle, White-tailed eagle.
- Subsaharan Africa: African fish eagle, Martial Eagle, Crowned eagle, Verreaux's eagle, Tawny eagle, Long-crested eagle

== Groups ==
Eagles are often informally divided into four groups. (Note: "There are four major groups of eagles: fish eagles, booted eagles, snake eagles and giant forest eagles.")

The snake eagles are placed in the subfamily Circaetinae. The fish eagles, booted eagles, and harpy eagles have traditionally been placed in the subfamily Buteoninae together with the buzzard-hawks (buteonine hawks) and harriers. Some authors may treat these groups as tribes of the Buteoninae; Lerner & Mindell proposed separating the eagle groups into their own subfamilies of Accipitridae.

=== Fish eagles ===
Fish eagles (or sea eagles) take fish as a large part of their diets, either fresh or as carrion.

Some authors include Gypohierax angolensis, the "vulturine fish eagle" (also called the palm-nut vulture) in this group. However, genetic analyses indicate it is related to a grouping of Neophron–Gypaetus–Eutriorchis (Egyptian vulture, bearded vulture (lammergeier), and Madagascar serpent eagle).

The fish eagles have a close genetic relationship with Haliastur and Milvus; the whole group is only distantly related to the Buteo group.

Fish eagles exist in every continent throughout the world, except for South America.

Although fish eagles can be found in many different places around the world, they have been classified as "Near Threatened". Reasons such as overfishing, pollution, habitat destruction, and the use of pesticides have contributed to the species' rapid population drop.

=== Booted eagles ===
Booted eagles or "true eagles" have feathered tarsi (lower legs).

Tribe Aquililae or proposed subfamily Aquilinae. Genera: Aquila, Hieraaetus; Spizaetus, Oroaetus, Spizastur; Nisaetus; Ictinaetus, Lophoaetus; Polemaetus; and Stephanoaetus.

See comments under eagle species for changes to the composition of these genera.

=== Snake eagles ===
Most snake or serpent eagles, as the name suggests, primarily prey on snakes.

- Subfamily Circaetinae. Genera: Circaetus, Spilornis, Dryotriorchis, Terathopius.
- Eutriorchis (subfamily Gypaetinae or Circaetinae).

Despite filling the niche of a snake eagle, genetic studies suggest that the Madagascar serpent eagle (Eutriorchis) is not related to them.

Over several decades, a great deal of research has been done on the Snake-eagle's diet, which is mainly made up of reptiles, especially snakes. When it comes to catching snakes, it is generally accepted that the bird exhibits generalist feeding behavior, which means it does not hunt down specific types of snakes but rather feeds on them depending on their availability in the wild.

=== Harpy eagles ===
Harpy eagles or "giant forest eagles" are large eagles that inhabit tropical forests. The group contains two to six species, depending on the author. Although these birds occupy similar niches and have traditionally been grouped, they are not all related: the solitary eagles are related to the black hawks and the Philippine eagle to the snake eagles.

- Harpy eagles (proposed subfamily Harpiinae)
  - Harpia harpyja, harpy eagle ― Central and South America.
  - Morphnus guianensis, crested eagle ― Central and South America.
  - Harpyopsis novaeguineae, Papuan eagle ― New Guinea.
- Philippine eagle
  - Pithecophaga jefferyi, Philippine eagle ― Philippines.
- Solitary eagles
  - Chaco eagle or crowned solitary eagle, Buteogallus (formerly Harpyhaliaetus) coronatus ― South America.
  - Solitary eagle or montane solitary eagle, Buteogallus (formerly Harpyhaliaetus) solitarius ― South America.

== Species ==
Martial eagle in Namibia

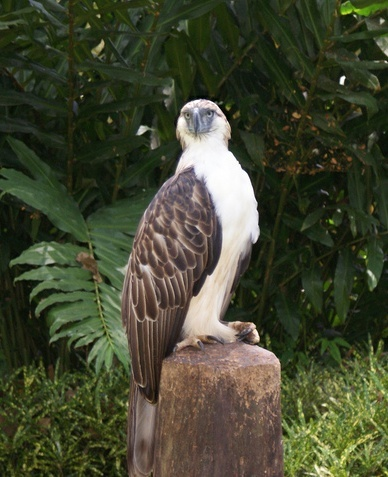
Philippine eagle (Pithecophaga jefferyi) in Southern Philippines

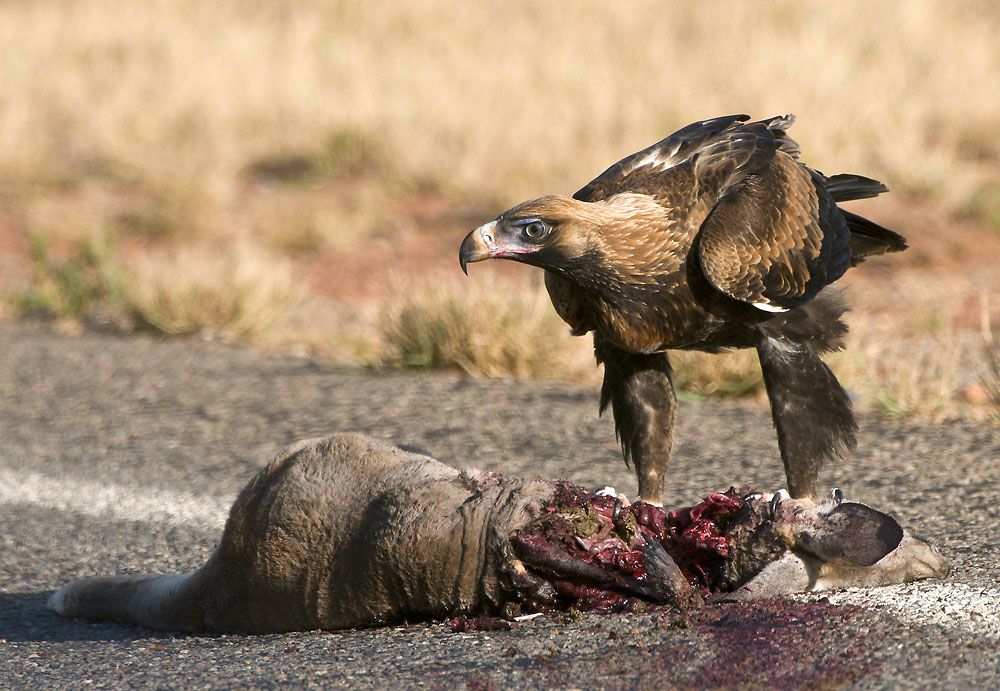
Wedge-tailed eagle in Australia

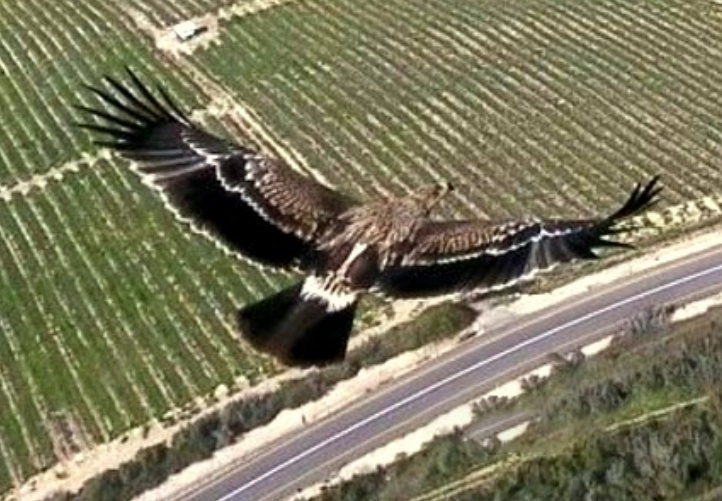
Eastern imperial eagle in Israel

Major new research into eagle taxonomy suggests that the important genera Aquila and Hieraaetus are not composed of nearest relatives, and it is likely that a reclassification of these genera will soon take place, with some species being moved to Lophaetus or Ictinaetus.

- Bonelli's eagle and the African hawk-eagle have been moved from Hieraaetus to Aquila.
- Either the greater spotted eagle and lesser spotted eagle should move from Aquila to join the long-crested eagle in Lophaetus, or, perhaps better, all three of these species should move to Ictinaetus with the black eagle.
- The steppe eagle and tawny eagle, once thought to be conspecific, are not even each other's nearest relatives.

Family Accipitridae

- Subfamily Aquilinae – true eagles, formerly included in Buteoninae
  - Genus Stephanoaetus
    - Crowned eagle, Stephanoaetus coronatus
    - Malagasy crowned eagle, †Stephanoaetus mahery
  - Genus Nisaetus – previously included in Spizaetus
    - Changeable hawk-eagle, N. cirrhatus
      - Flores hawk-eagle N. floris – earlier a subspecies, S. c. floris
    - Sulawesi hawk-eagle, N. lanceolatus
    - Mountain hawk-eagle, N. nipalensis
      - Legge's hawk-eagle, Nisaetus kelaarti – previously a race of S. nipalensis
    - Blyth's hawk-eagle, N. alboniger
    - Javan hawk-eagle, N. bartelsi
    - (Northern) Philippine hawk-eagle, N. philippensis
      - Pinsker's hawk-eagle (Southern Philippine hawk-eagle), Nisaetus pinskeri – earlier S. philippensis pinskeri
    - Wallace's hawk-eagle, N. nanus
  - Genus Spizaetus
    - Black hawk-eagle, S. tyrannus
    - Ornate hawk-eagle, S. ornatus
    - Black-and-white hawk-eagle, S. melanoleucus – formerly Spizastur
    - Black-and-chestnut eagle, S. isidori – formerly Oroaetus
  - Genus Lophotriorchis
    - Rufous-bellied eagle, L. kienerii
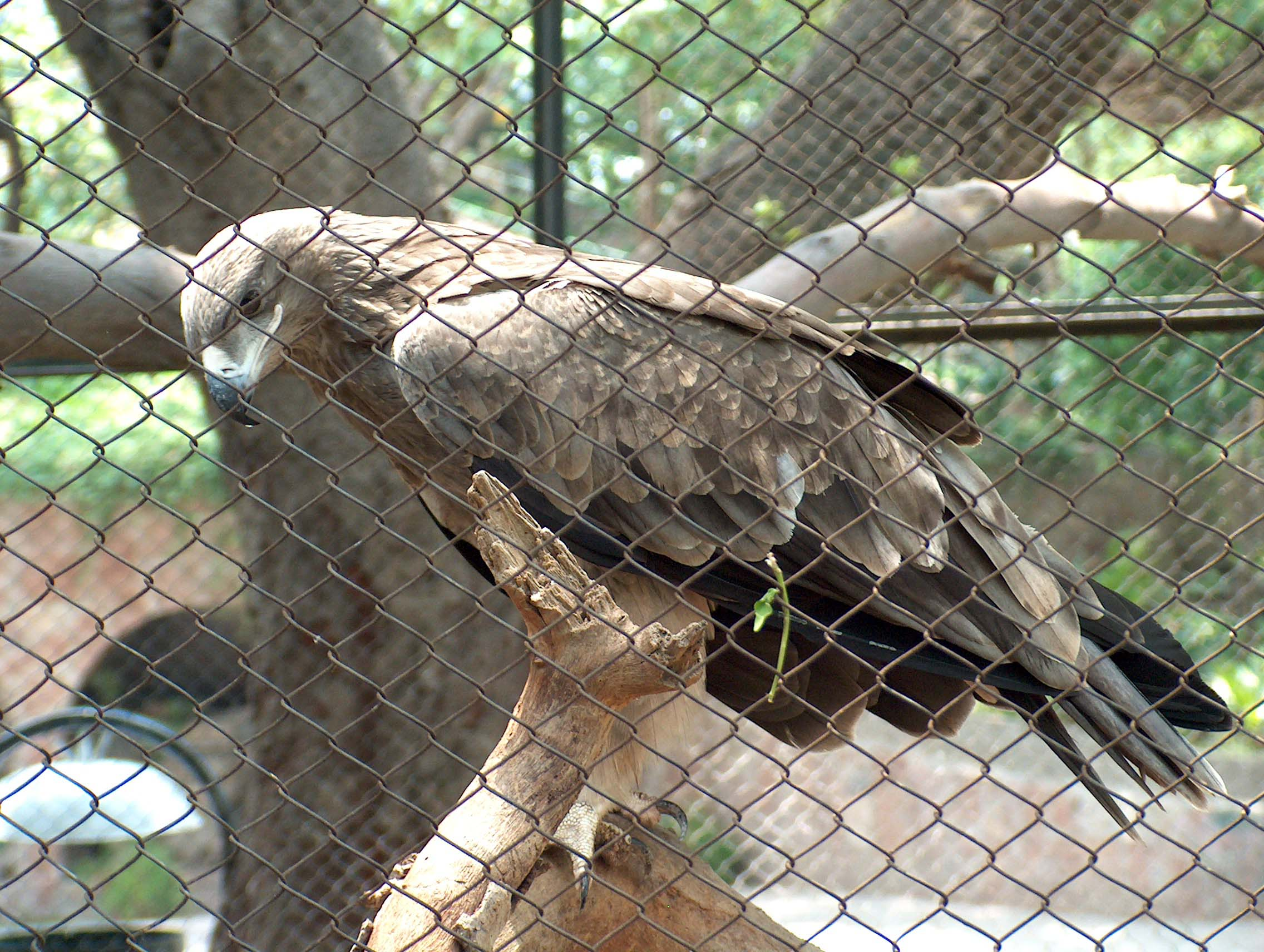
      A steppe eagle in Lahore Zoo, Pakistan
  - Genus Polemaetus
    - Martial eagle, Polemaetus bellicosus
  - Genus Lophaetus
    - Long-crested eagle, Lophaetus occipitalis – possibly belongs in Ictinaetus
  - Genus Ictinaetus
    - Black eagle, Ictinaetus malaiensis
  - Genus Hieraaetus
    - Ayres's hawk-eagle, H. ayresii
    - Little eagle, H. morphnoides
    - Pygmy eagle, H. weiskei – previously subspecies H. m. weiskei
    - Booted eagle, H. pennatus
    - Haast's eagle, †H. moorei
  - Genus Aquila
    - Bonelli's eagle, Aquila fasciata – formerly Hieraaetus fasciatus
    - African hawk-eagle, A. spilogaster – formerly in Hieraaetus
    - Cassin's hawk-eagle, A. africana – formerly in Hieraaetus or Spizaetus genera
    - Golden eagle, A. chrysaetos
    - Eastern imperial eagle, A. heliaca
    - Spanish imperial eagle A. adalberti
    - Steppe eagle, A. nipalensis
    - Tawny eagle, A. rapax
    - Greater spotted eagle, A. clanga – to be moved to Lophaetus or Ictinaetus
    - Lesser spotted eagle, A. pomarina – to be moved to Lophaetus or Ictinaetus
    - Indian spotted eagle, A. hastata – to be moved to Lophaetus or Ictinaetus
    - Verreaux's eagle, A. verreauxii
    - Gurney's eagle, A. gurneyi
    - Wahlberg's eagle, A. wahlbergi – to be moved to Hieraaetus
    - Wedge-tailed eagle, A. audax
- Subfamily Buteoninae – hawks, buzzards and erns
  - Genus Geranoaetus
    - Black-chested buzzard-eagle, Geranoaetus melanoleucus
  - Genus Harpyhaliaetus
    - Chaco eagle, Buteogallus coronatus
    - Solitary eagle, H. solitarius
  - Genus Haliaeetus – sometimes grouped together with Icthyophaga as Haliaeetinae
    - White-tailed eagle, Haliaeetus albicilla
    - Bald eagle, H. leucocephalus
    - Steller's sea eagle, H. pelagicus
    - Pallas's sea eagle, H. leucoryphus
  - Genus Icthyophaga – sometimes grouped together with Haliaeetus as Haliaeetinae
    - Lesser fish eagle, Icthyophaga humilis
    - Grey-headed fish eagle, I. ichthyaetus
    - African fish eagle, I. vocifer
    - White-bellied sea eagle, I. leucogaster
    - Sanford's sea eagle, I. sanfordi
    - Madagascar fish eagle, I. vociferoides

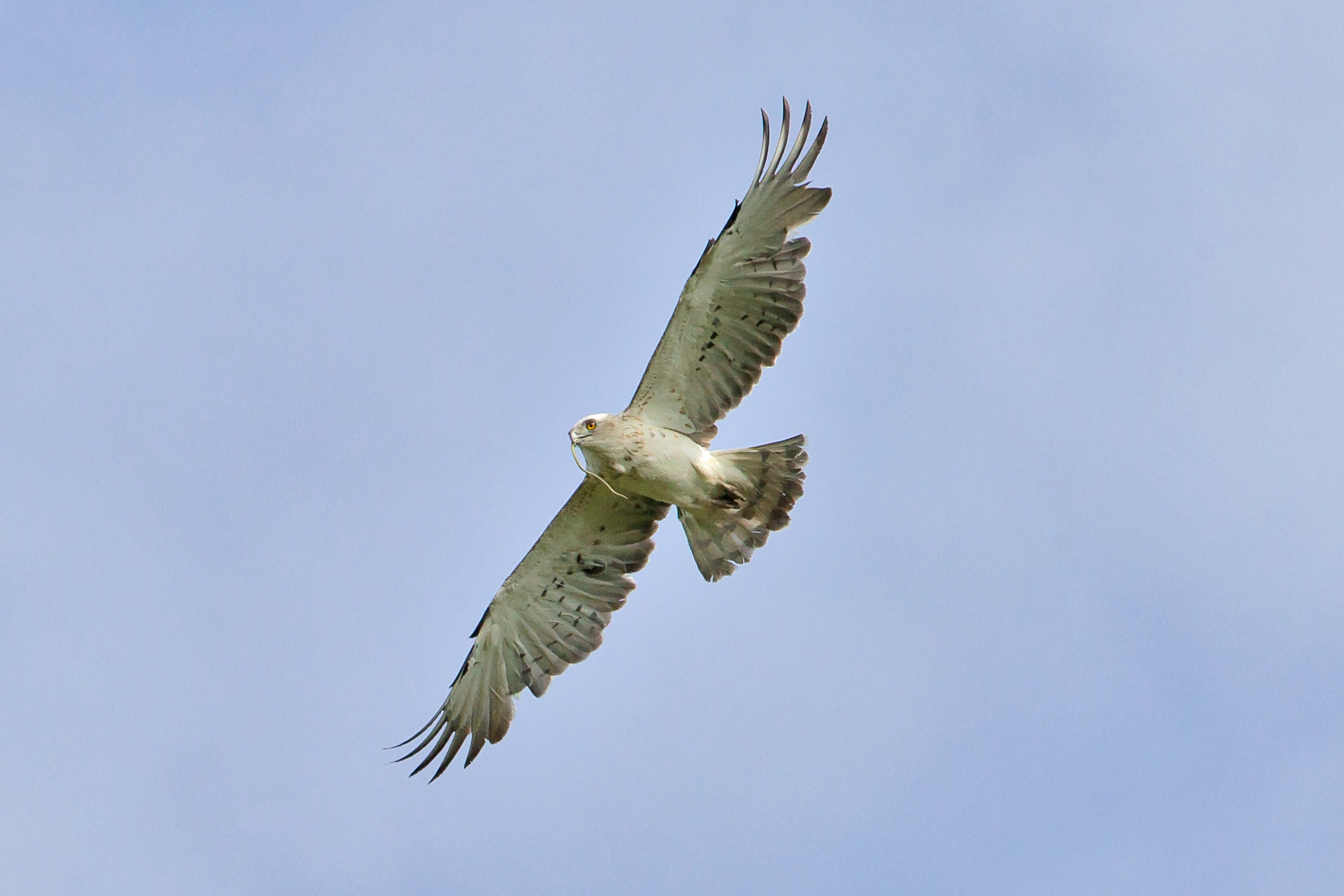
Short-toed snake eagle in flight

- Subfamily Circaetinae: snake-eagles
  - Genus Spilornis
    - Crested serpent eagle, Spilornis cheela
      - Central Nicobar serpent eagle, S. minimus (subspecies or species)
    - Great Nicobar serpent eagle, S. klossi
    - Mountain serpent eagle, S. kinabaluensis
    - Sulawesi serpent eagle, S. rufipectus
    - Philippine serpent eagle, S. holospilus
    - Andaman serpent eagle, S. elgini
  - Genus Pithecophaga
    - Philippine eagle, Pithecophaga jefferyi
  - Genus Terathopius
    - Bateleur, Terathopius ecaudatus
  - Genus Circaetus
    - Short-toed snake eagle, Circaetus gallicus
    - Beaudouin's snake eagle, Circaetus beaudouini
    - Black-chested snake eagle, C. pectoralis
    - Brown snake eagle, C. cinereus
    - Fasciated snake eagle, C. fasciolatus
    - Western banded snake eagle, C. cinerascens
  - Genus Dryotriorchis
    - Congo serpent eagle, D. spectabilis
  - Genus Eutriorchis – placement uncertain, may be part of Gypaetinae or Perninae
    - Madagascar serpent eagle, Eutriorchis astur
- Subfamily Harpiinae – harpies, formerly included in Buteoninae
  - Genus Morphnus
    - Crested eagle, Morphnus guianensis
  - Genus Harpyopsis
    - Papuan eagle, Harpyopsis novaeguineae
  - Genus Harpia
    - Harpy eagle, Harpia harpyja

== In culture ==
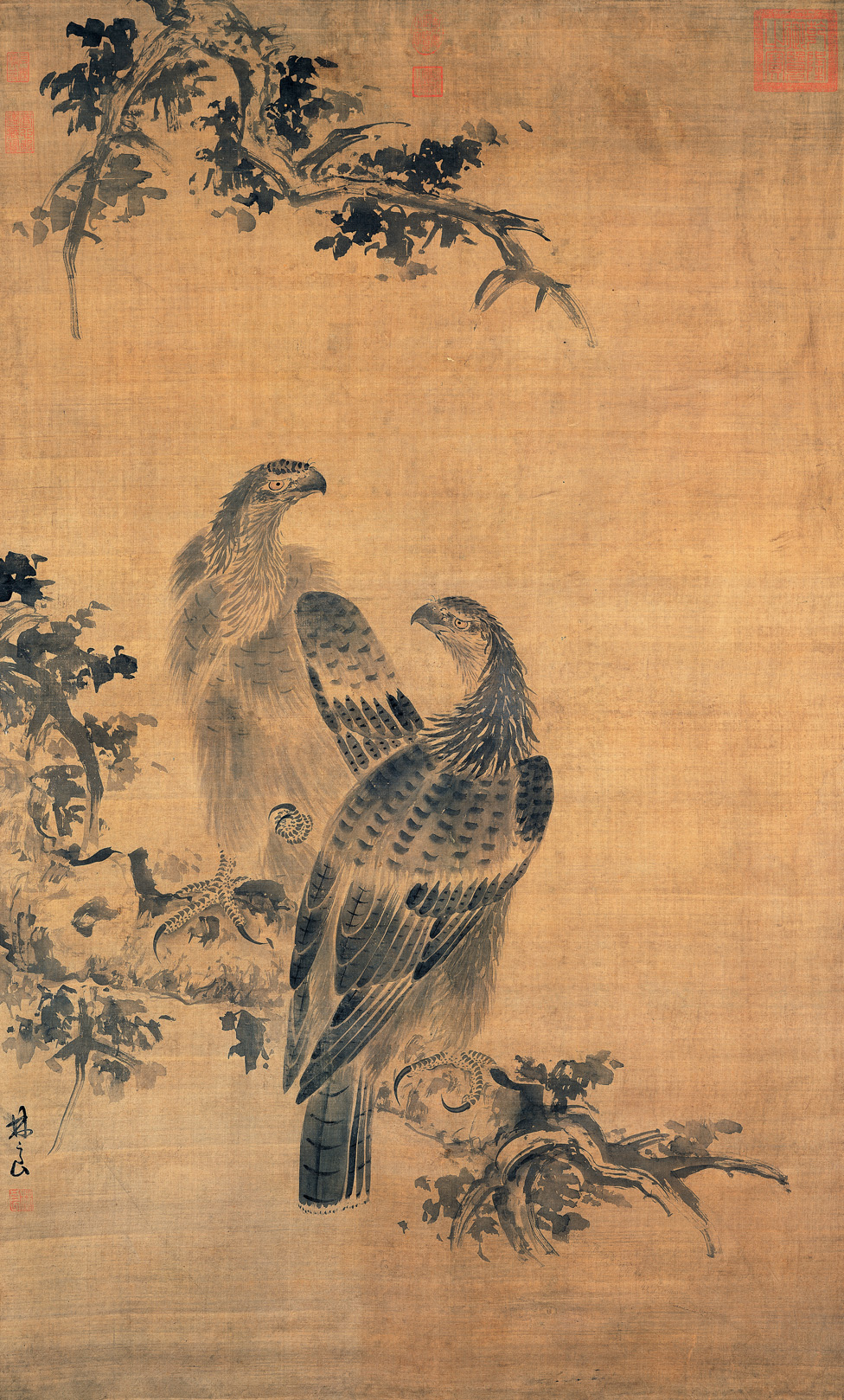
Eagles, a Chinese Ming period painting; Located at the National Palace Museum

=== Etymology ===
The modern English term for the bird is derived from Latin: aquila by way of French: aigle. The origin of aquila is unknown, but it is believed to possibly derive from aquilus (meaning dark-colored, swarthy, or blackish) as a reference to the plumage of eagles.

Old English used the term earn, related to Scandinavia's ørn/örn. It is similar to other Indo-European terms for "bird" or "eagle", including Greek: ὄρνις (ornís), Russian: орёл (orël), and Welsh: eryr.

In the southern part of Finland, near the Gulf of Finland, is the town of Kotka, which literally means "eagle", while the town of L'Aquila in the central part of Italy literally means "the eagle".

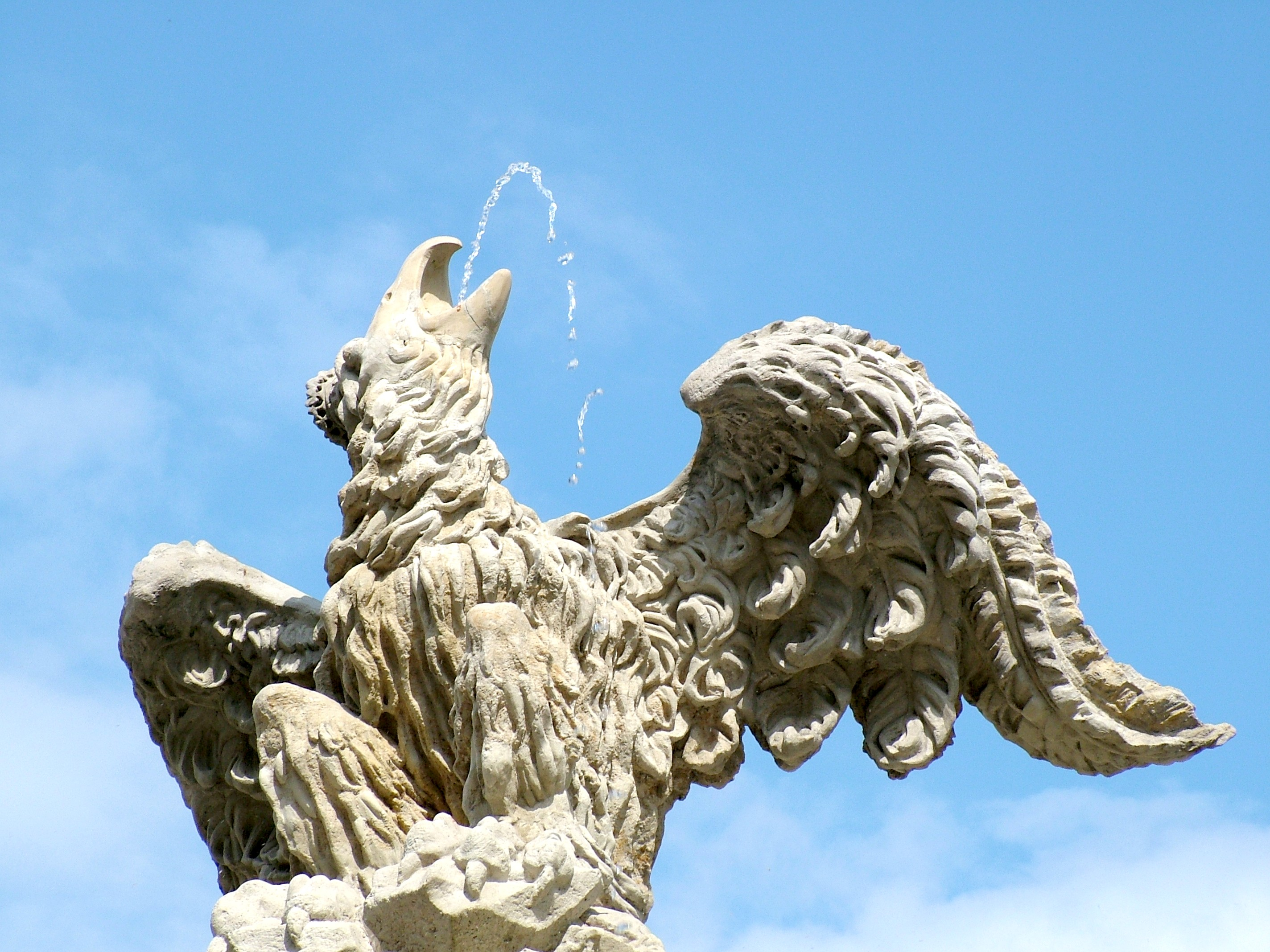
The sculpture of eagle at the top of the fountain at Plac Orła Białego in Szczecin, Poland

In Britain before 1678, eagle referred specifically to the golden eagle, with the other native species, the white-tailed eagle, being known as erne. The modern name "golden eagle" for aquila chrysaetos was introduced by the naturalist John Ray.

The village of Eagle in Lincolnshire, England, has nothing to do with the bird; its name is derived from the Old English words for "oak" and "wood" (compare Oakley).

=== Religion and spirituality ===
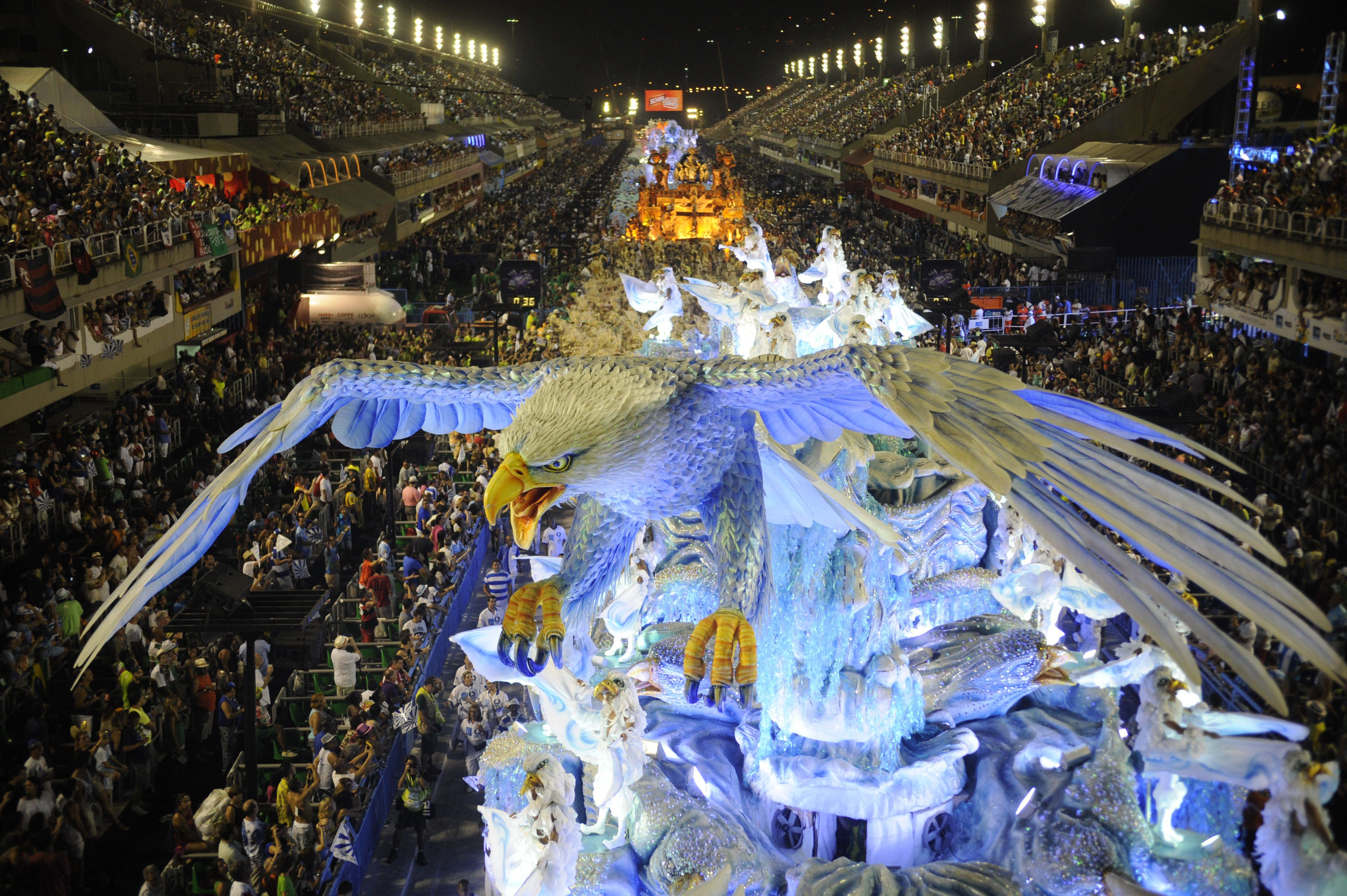
Representation of an eagle at Rio Carnival, 2014

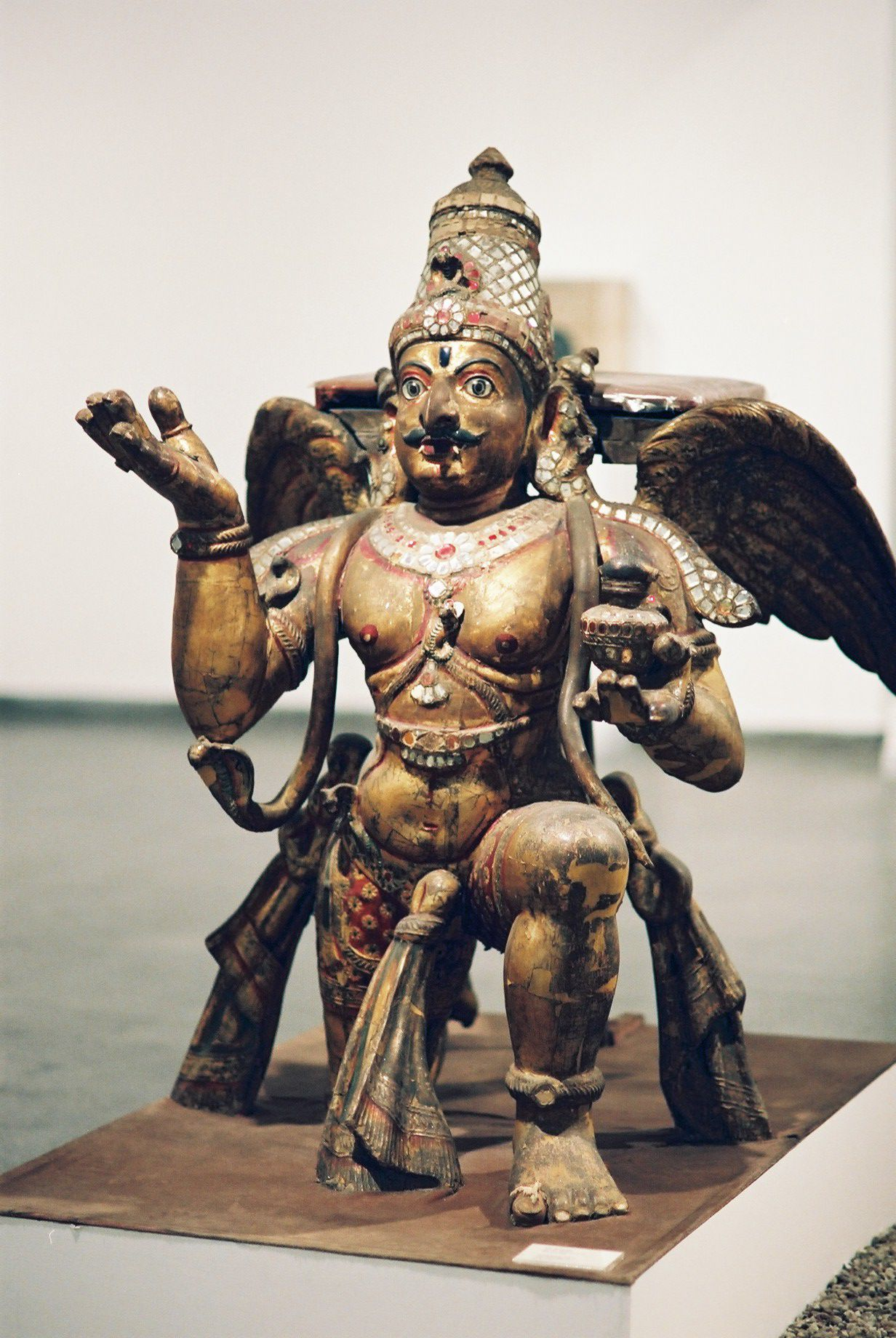
Garuda, the vahana (mount) of Vishnu, depicted with an eagle's beak and wings

In the ancient Sumerian mythology, the mythical king Etana was said to have been carried into heaven by an eagle. Classical writers such as Lucan and Pliny the Elder claimed that the eagle was able to look directly at the sun, and that they forced their fledglings to do the same. Those that blinked would be cast from the nest. This belief persisted until the Medieval era.

The eagle is the patron animal of the ancient Greek god Zeus. In particular, Zeus was said to have taken the form of an eagle in order to abduct Ganymede, and there are numerous artistic depictions of the eagle Zeus bearing Ganymede aloft, from Classical times up to the present (see illustrations in the Ganymede (mythology) page.)

Eagles appear metaphorically in many translations of the Old Testament. God is spoken of as carrying Israel on "eagles' wings" in Exodus 19:4, Isaiah 40:31 compares those who wait on the Lord to flying eagles, and Psalm 103 mentions renewing one's youth "as the eagle". In explaining this rejuvenation, Augustine of Hippo says in his commentary on the Psalms that eagles' beaks overgrow as they age and that they break them against rocks to restore them. The translation, however, is uncertain: the word in the Hebrew, נשר, can also be translated vulture, and is listed alongside specific kinds of vulture in Leviticus' discussion of unclean animals.

The eagle is also often used in Christian iconography to represent the Gospel of John, and eagle-shaped lecterns are common in Anglican and some Roman Catholic churches. The eagle was believed to be able to look directly into the sun in the same way that the Gospel of John looks directly at Jesus' divinity, and the great distances the eagle flies represent the spread of the gospel to the ends of the earth.

The United States eagle feather law stipulates that only individuals of certifiable Native American ancestry enrolled in a federally recognized tribe are legally authorized to obtain eagle feathers for religious or spiritual reasons. In Canada, the poaching of eagle feathers for the booming U.S. market has sometimes resulted in the arrests of First Nations persons for the crime.

The Moche people of ancient Peru worshiped the eagle and often depicted eagles in their art. The golden eagle was sacred to the Aztec god Huitzilopochtli while the harpy eagle was sacred to Quetzalcoatl.

=== Heraldry ===
Coat of arms of Austria.

Coat of arms of Kotka, Finland

Coat of arms of the United States

Eagles are an exceptionally common symbol in heraldry, being considered the "King of Birds" in contrast to the lion, the "King of Beasts". Whereas the lion (e.g. England) usually represents authority, the eagle is the symbol of power. They are particularly popular in Germanic countries such as Austria, due to their association with the Holy Roman Empire. The eagle of the Holy Roman Empire was two-headed, supposedly representing the two divisions, East and West, of the old Roman Empire. This motif, derived from the Byzantine (Eastern Roman) Empire was also adopted by the Russian Empire and is still featured in the Flag of Albania. The Roman eagle was preceded by the eagle of Ptolemaic Egypt and the Achaemenid Empire. In the coat of arms of Kotka, Finland, the eagle is depicted carrying an anchor and the caduceus on its feet.

Heraldic eagles are most often found displayed, i.e. with their wings and legs extended. They can also occur close, i.e. with their wings folded, or rising, i.e. about to take flight. The heads, wings, and legs of eagles can also be found independently.

Eagles symbolize strength, courage, and independence and are commonly found in the heraldry of many nations across the world. Albania, Andorra, Armenia, Austria, Dagestan, Egypt, Germany, Ghana, Indonesia, Iraq, Jordan, Kazakhstan, Mexico, Montenegro, Nigeria, the Philippines, Poland, Palestine, Panama, Russia, Romania, Serbia, South Sudan, Somaliland, Syria, the United States of America, Yemen, Zambia, and Zimbabwe are the nations whose coats of arms feature an eagle. The eagle's continuing significance and worldwide appeal as a forceful symbol in national identity and imagery is demonstrated by its widespread usage.
