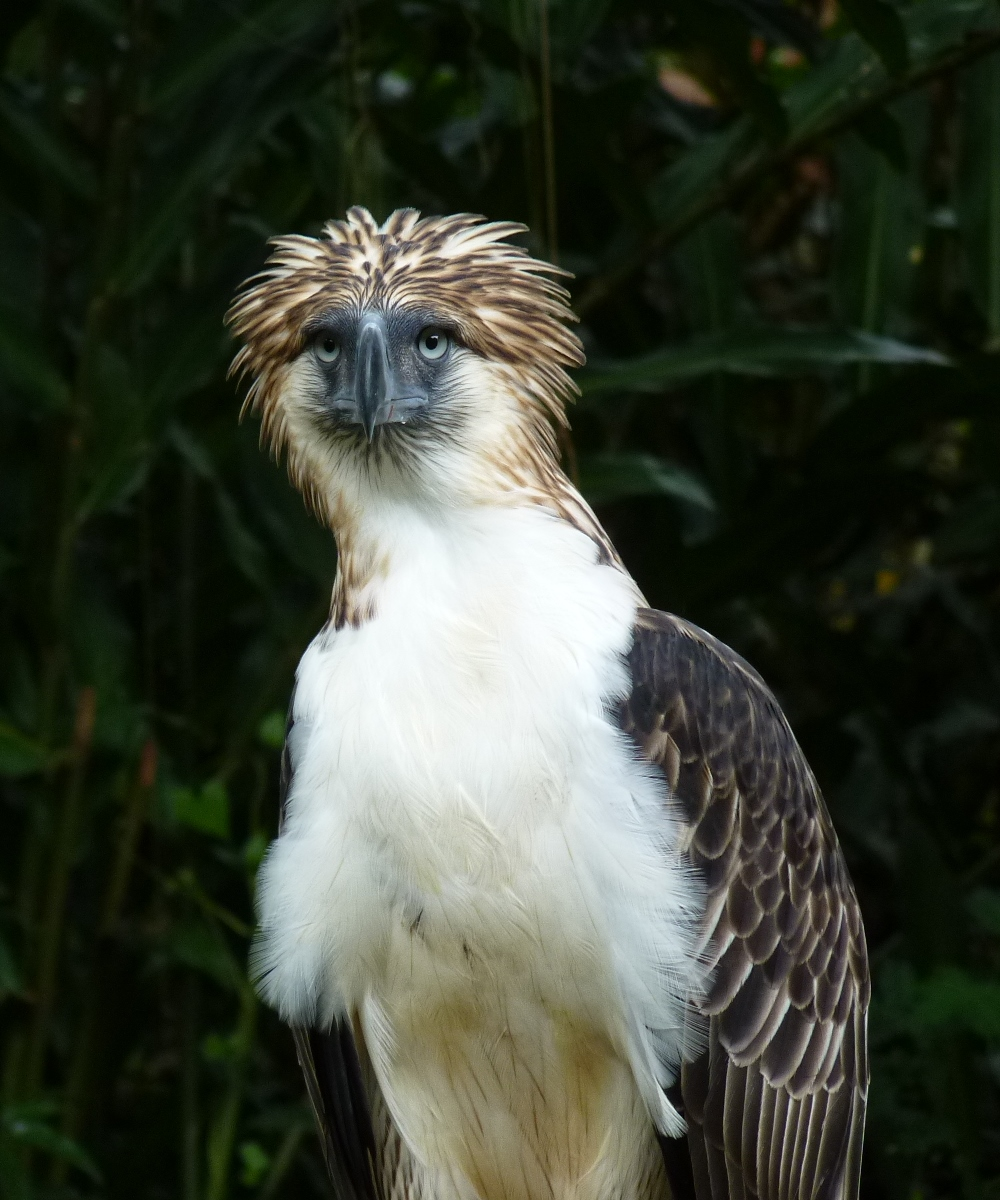
- Philippine eagle (Pithecophaga jefferyi)

Scientific classification
- Kingdom: Animalia
- Phylum: Chordata
- Class: Aves
- Order: Accipitriformes
- Family: Accipitridae
- Subfamily: Circaetinae; Blyth, 1851

Type genus
- Circaetus Vieillot, 1816

Genera
- See text.

= Circaetinae =

Snake eagles

Subfamily of birds

Circaetinae is a subfamily of the family Accipitridae which contains a group of medium to large broad-winged birds of prey. The group is sometimes treated as tribe Circaetini. These birds mainly specialise in feeding on snakes and other reptiles, which is the reason most are referred to as "snake-eagles" or "serpent-eagles". The exceptions are the bateleur, a more generalised hunter, and the Philippine eagle, which preys on mammals and birds.

All but one of the subfamily are restricted to warmer parts of the Old World: Spilornis and Pithecophaga in south Asia, the others in Africa. The short-toed eagle Circaetus gallicus migrates between temperate Eurasia and Africa, as well as being resident in India.

They have hooked beaks for tearing flesh from their prey, strong legs and powerful talons. They also have extremely keen eyesight to enable them to spot potential prey from a distance.

== Taxonomy ==
The subfamily Circaetinae was introduced in 1851 by the English zoologist Edward Blyth with Circaetus as the type genus.

The genus level cladogram of the Circaetinae shown below is based on a molecular phylogenetic study of the Accipitridae by Therese Catanach and collaborators that was published in 2024.

- Circaetinae
  - Spilornis – serpent eagles (6 species)
  - - Pithecophaga – Philippine eagle
    - - Terathopius – Bateleur
      - Circaetus – snake eagles (7 species)

The following taxonomy is based on the International Ornithological Congress.

Image	Genus	Living species
	Spilornis G.R. Gray, 1840	Crested serpent eagle, S. cheela; Great Nicobar serpent eagle, S. klossi; Mountain serpent eagle, S. kinabaluensis; Sulawesi serpent eagle, S. rufipectus; Philippine serpent eagle, S. holospilus; Andaman serpent eagle, S. elgini
	Pithecophaga Ogilvie-Grant, 1896	Philippine eagle, P. jefferyi
	Circaetus Vieillot, 1816	Congo serpent eagle, C. spectabilis; Short-toed snake eagle, C. gallicus; Beaudouin's snake eagle, C. beaudouini; Black-chested snake eagle, C. pectoralis; Brown snake eagle, C. cinereus; Southern banded snake eagle, C. fasciolatus; Western banded snake eagle, C. cinerascens
	Terathopius Lesson, 1830	Bateleur, T. ecaudatus
	Eutriorchis Sharpe, 1875 (Note: Eutriorchis is genetically related to Gypaetus, and so might be classified with the Gypaetinae rather than Circaetinae. Lerner, Heather R. L.; Mindell, David P. (9 May 2006). "Accipitridae". The Tree of Life Web Project.)	Madagascar serpent eagle, E. astur
