= Nicobar serpent eagle =

Nicobar serpent eagle can refer to two species:

- Great Nicobar serpent eagle (Spilornis klossi)
- Central Nicobar serpent eagle (Spilornis minimus), often considered a subspecies of the crested serpent eagle (Spilornis cheela)
