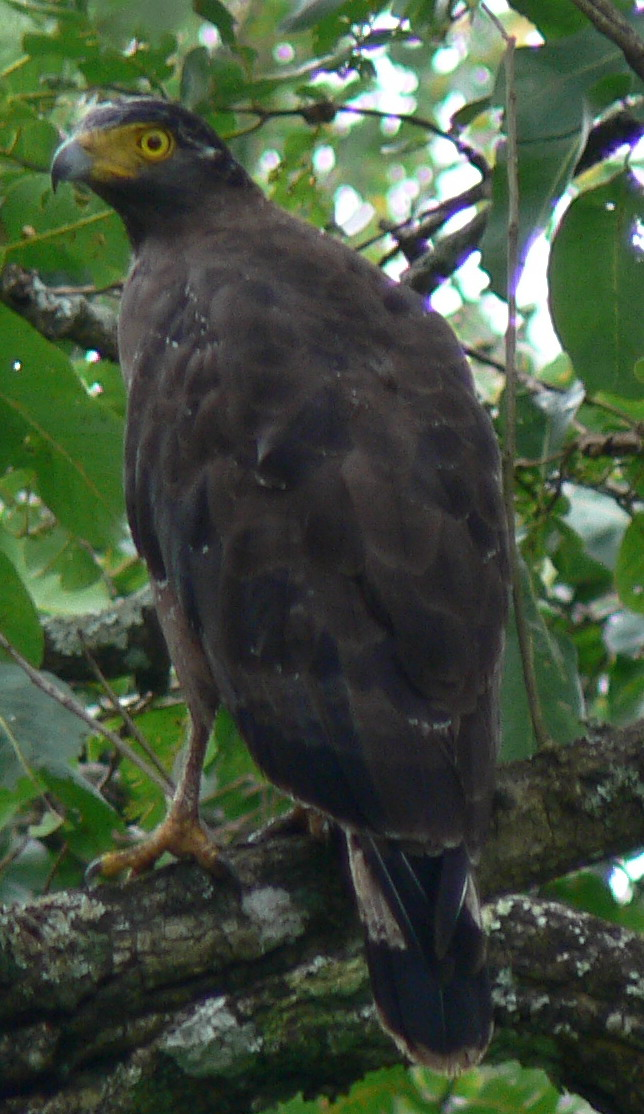
- Crested serpent eagle (Spilornis cheela)

Scientific classification
- Kingdom: Animalia
- Phylum: Chordata
- Class: Aves
- Order: Accipitriformes
- Family: Accipitridae
- Subfamily: Circaetinae
- Genus: Spilornis; G.R. Gray, 1840

Type species
- Falco cheela Latham, 1790

= Spilornis =

Genus of birds

Spilornis is a genus of bird of prey in the family Accipitridae. As adults all have dark crowns, and bright yellow eyes and cere. These medium-sized raptors are found in forests of southern Asia and are known as serpent-eagles, an English name shared with two African species from the genera Dryotriorchis and Eutriorchis.

== Etymology ==
Greek: σπιλος spilos "spot"; ορνις ornis, ορνιθος ornithos "bird".

== Species ==
As traditionally defined, there are 6 species in this genus. It has been proposed that several small island populations, usually included in the Crested Serpent Eagle, be split into separate species.

Genus Spilornis – G.R. Gray, 1840 – six species
| Common name | Scientific name and subspecies | Range | Size and ecology | IUCN status and estimated population |
|---|---|---|---|---|
| Andaman serpent eagle | Spilornis elgini (Blyth, 1863) | Andaman Islands in southeast India. | Size: Habitat: Diet: | VU |
| Great Nicobar serpent eagle | Spilornis klossi (Richmond, 1902) Two subspecies: S. k. minimus; S. k. klossi | Indian island of Great Nicobar | Size: Habitat: Diet: | EN |
| Sulawesi serpent eagle | Spilornis rufipectus (Gould, 1858) Two subspecies: S. r. rufipectus - Gould, 1858; S. r. sulaensis - (Schlegel, 1866) | Sulawesi in Indonesia | Size: Habitat: Diet: | LC |
| Crested serpent eagle | Spilornis cheela (Latham, 1790) Twenty one subspecies: S. c. batu; S. c. bido; S. c. burmanicus; S. c. cheela; S. c. hoya; S. c. malayensis; S. c. melanotis; S. c. palawanensis; S. c. pallidus; S. c. richmondi; S. c. ricketti; S. c. rutherfordi; S. c. spilogaster; S. c. abbotti; S. c. asturinus; S. c. baweanus; S. c. davisoni; S. c. minimus; S. c. natunensis; S. c. perplexus; S. c. sipora | across the Indian Subcontinent, Southeast Asia and East Asia | Size: Habitat: Diet: | LC |
| Philippine serpent eagle | Spilornis holospilus (Vigors, 1831) | Philippines | Size: Habitat: Diet: | LC |
| Mountain serpent eagle | Spilornis kinabaluensis Sclater, WL, 1919 | northern Borneo | Size: Habitat: Diet: | NT |
