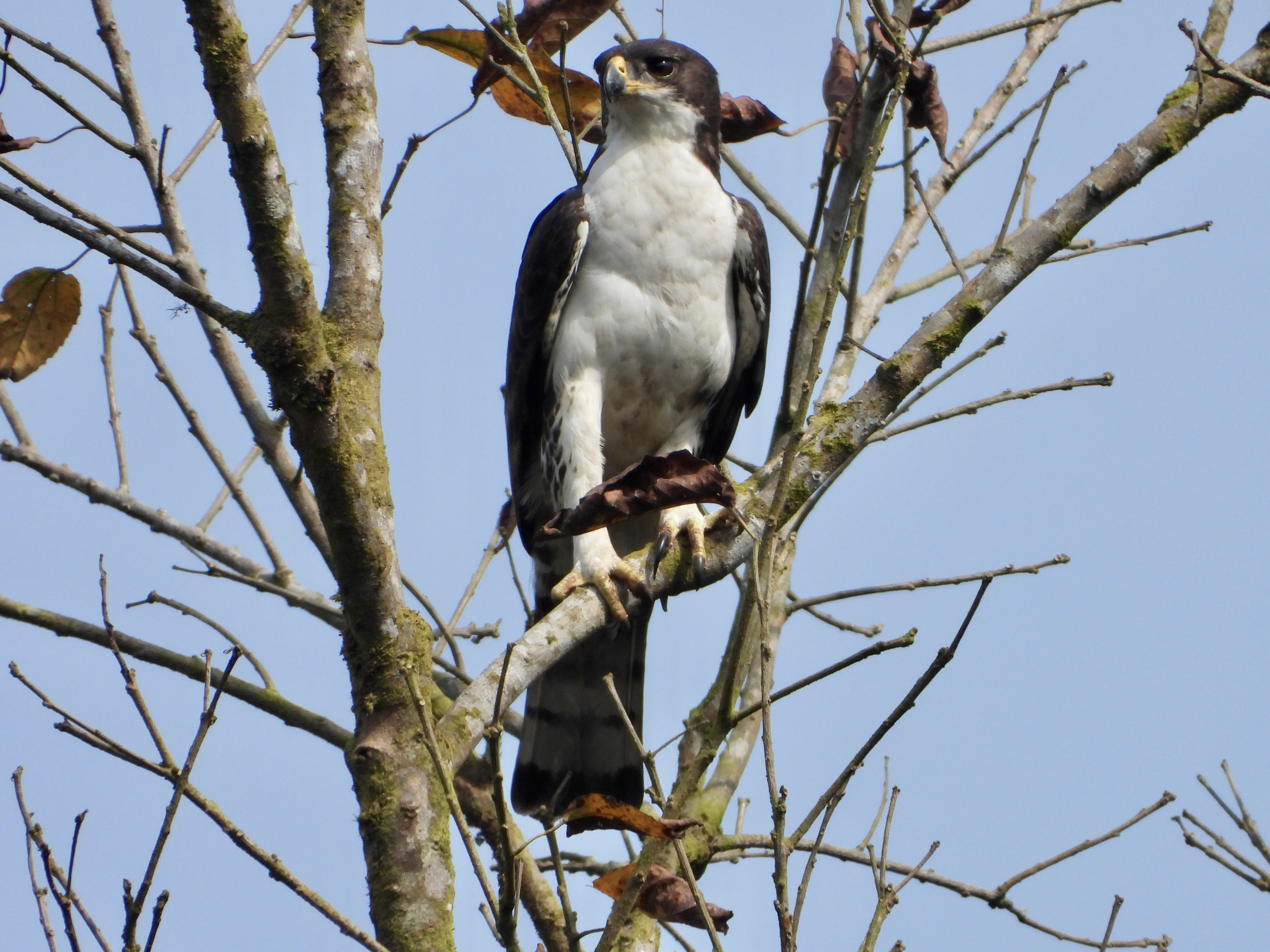
- Cassin's hawk-eagle at Mt. Cameroon

Conservation status
- Least Concern (IUCN 3.1)

Scientific classification
- Kingdom: Animalia
- Phylum: Chordata
- Class: Aves
- Order: Accipitriformes
- Family: Accipitridae
- Genus: Aquila
- Species: A. africana

Binomial name
- Aquila africana (Cassin, 1865)

Synonyms
- Spizaetus africanus (Cassin, 1865); Hieraaetus africanus (Cassin, 1865); Cassinaetus africanus (Cassin, 1865)

= Cassin's hawk-eagle =

Species of bird

Cassin's hawk-eagle (Aquila africana) or Cassin's eagle, is a relatively small eagle in the family Accipitridae. Its feathered legs mark it as member of the Aquilinae or booted eagle subfamily. A forest-dependent species, it occurs in primary rainforests across western, central and (marginally) eastern Africa where it preys on birds and tree squirrels. It was named after John Cassin who first described it in 1865. Due to widespread habitat destruction, its populations are steadily declining but have not yet warranted upgrading its status from Least Concern.

== Description ==
The adult Cassin's hawk-eagle appears as a small eagle, with short rounded wings and a long rounded tail. It has dark brown upperparts, with white spots and a brown tail with three black bars and a broad black subterminal band. The tarsi are white with black streaks, and the underparts are all white or white with black blotches along the sides of the lower breast. It has yellowish-brown eyes, pale yellow ceres and feet and a black bill. Immature and juvenile plumage is strikingly different from that of adults. A brown or rufous head with dusky lores and streaked black on the throat and centre of the crown is typical. The underparts are white and the breast russet with half-concealed blackish spots, while the belly and flanks are marked with dense black spotting. The tail is dark gray with a white tip and dark barring and the dark brown wings have white-tipped secondary feathers. In flight, the juvenile shows pale underwing coverts whereas an adult has dark underwing coverts and a black band along the rear edge of the wing. The immature gains its adult plumage by becoming blacker above and whiter below.

A fairly small eagle, under current classification, Cassin's hawk-eagle is the smallest member of the Aquila genus. Measuring 50–56 cm (20–22 in) in length, it has a wingspan of 103–113 cm (41–44 in) and weighs in at 0.9–1.2 kg (2.0–2.6 lb). Strong reversed sexual size dimorphism is present, with females far larger than males.

== Taxonomy ==
Cassin's hawk-eagle taxonomy has been in flux ever since it was first described and remains uncertain to this day. Previously, the broader taxonomy of true eagles was based on morphological similarities such as plumage patterns that yielded the 'booted eagle' (eagles with feathered tarsi) and 'hawk-eagle' contained groupings. As such, Cassin's hawk-eagle was formerly allocated to the genera Limnaetus, Phoeoaetus, Cassinaetus, Hieraaetus, and Spizaetus in no particular order. It was moved to Hieraeetus when Spizaetus was restricted to the Neotropical hawk eagles but recent molecular studies using mitochondrial DNA have shown that both of those genera are paraphyletic and that Cassin's hawk-eagle forms a clade with the larger booted eagles of the genus Aquila. Its closest relatives are Aquila fasciata and Aquila spilogaster (both formerly of Hieraaetus) which together form a distinct sub-clade of Aquila. The visual similarities with other hawk-eagles can be explained by convergent evolution but there is still some work being done on booted eagle phylogeny in general, so this may change in the future.

In 2017, a group of researchers proposed that the official English name be changed from "Cassin's hawk-eagle" to "Cassin's eagle", so that the term hawk-eagle could be restricted to current members of Spizaetus and Niseatus in line with the global effort to make bird names more consistent. This has yet to be implemented by most listing authorities.

== Distribution and habitat ==
West, central and marginally east Africa; from Sierra Leone east to western Uganda and south through the Congo Basin to northern Angola. Restricted to primary rainforest, A. africana is thought to have been more widespread in the past but its distribution has since contracted with the continued destruction of the Guinea-Congolian Forests. Repeated sightings of individuals in primary rainforest fragments in Kenya's Imenti Forest and the Ndundulu Forest in Tanzania have been interpreted as biogeographical evidence for past links between isolated forests in East Africa and those much further West. Cassin's hawk-eagle's preference for primary forest is so strong that its presence is reduced even in slightly disturbed forest and it is completely absent from secondary forest and open biomes which explains its absence between the forests.

== Ecology ==
The details of the ecology and behaviour of Cassin's hawk-eagle, like most hawk-eagles, are barely known as it is a secretive and rarely observed species, usually seen when soaring over the forest canopy. Its habitat of choice, primary rainforest, is also notoriously difficult to navigate, making surveys and studies extremely difficult. Before 1970, almost nothing was known about its breeding habits but since then multiple studies have uncovered some details. Both sexes help construct the nest with sticks more than 25 m (82 ft) above the forest floor in the canopy of a tree where it is lined with fresh foliage. The clutch size is 1-2 eggs which are laid from October–December in Ghana and Gabon, and in December in Uganda, therefore making it an annual breeder. The length of incubation is unknown but is likely between 40 and 45 days. During the 'branching period', the nestling typically spends most of the day off the nest, periodically half-jumping and half-flying from one branch of the nest tree to another. Fledging age is reached between 70 and 100 days and the total time between nest initiation and independence of the juvenile is close to 260 days, which is similar to other booted eagles.

When the stomach contents of collected specimens have been examined they have been found to contain the remains of birds and tree squirrels, although it is possible that other vertebrates are eaten too. Soaring above the forest canopy, Cassin's hawk-eagles are able to spot their prey from the air before commencing the attack.

=== Mimicry ===
Cassin's hawk-eagle is a proposed partner in a visual mimicry system where it is the model to the Congo serpent eagle (Circaetus spectabilis) mimic. This is one of two similar independent systems involving serpent eagles – the other being between the Madagascar serpent eagle (Eutriorchis astur) and Henst's goshawk (Accipiter henstii) on the island of Madagascar. These proposed mimicry systems are unusual in that they involve two predatory species that show remarkable similarity in plumage colour and pattern as well as in body size and proportions. A. africana and C. spectabilis differ greatly in diet though, with the former preying on forest birds and tree squirrels and the latter predominantly on reptiles like snakes. The visual mimicry, if true, is thought to have evolved due to a foraging advantage gained by the serpent eagle, since its prey do not flee from the bird-eating model, and/or lowered predation risk from the model or other predators towards the mimic, and/or reduced mobbing by small birds. However, random convergence due to the constrained evolution of plumage colours and patterns within a shared habitat, cannot be ruled out.

== Conservation status ==
Cassin's hawk-eagle is currently categorised as Least Concern by BirdLife International and the IUCN. Despite a decreasing population, estimated at 1,000-10,000 individuals, Cassin's hawk-eagles has a large geographic range and its population decline is not severe enough for it to be given Vulnerable status as a species. Due to its reliance on primary tropical forest and the varying rates of destruction of this habitat across Africa, the Cassin's hawk-eagle is regionally threatened and in dire need of population studies to accurately establish the status and effects of human-caused habitat alteration. Thiollay (1985) suggests that lumbering be restricted to removing only small patches of forest to prevent too much degradation, however this strategy is unlikely to be followed, unless enforced, due to the reduced economic gain.
