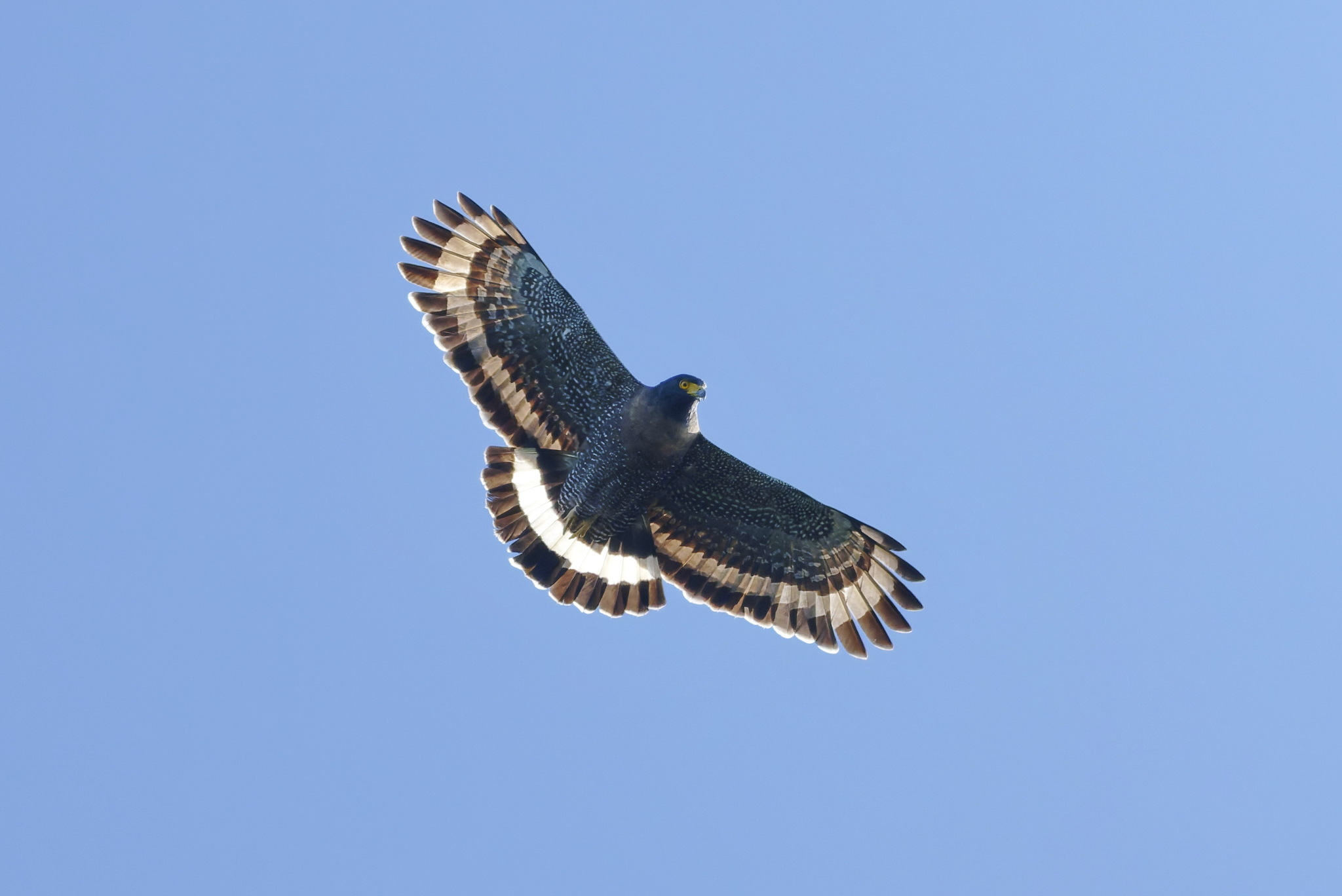

Conservation status
- Near Threatened (IUCN 3.1)

Scientific classification
- Kingdom: Animalia
- Phylum: Chordata
- Class: Aves
- Order: Accipitriformes
- Family: Accipitridae
- Genus: Spilornis
- Species: S. kinabaluensis

Binomial name
- Spilornis kinabaluensis Sclater, WL, 1919

= Mountain serpent eagle =

Species of bird

The mountain serpent eagle (Spilornis kinabaluensis), also known as the Kinabalu serpent eagle, is a bird of prey that is found in northern Borneo. It is found at altitudes of 1,000–4,100 metres (3,300–13,500 ft) in forest, especially where it becomes stunted. Where their range overlaps, the crested serpent eagle generally occurs at lower altitudes. The mountain serpent eagle is darker than the Bornean subspecies of the crested serpent eagle.

The mountain serpent eagle is threatened by habitat loss. However, they occur within the Kinabalu National Park and the Gunung Mulu National Park. Their high-altitude habitats are usually too remote for logging and agriculture, making some of its range secure.
