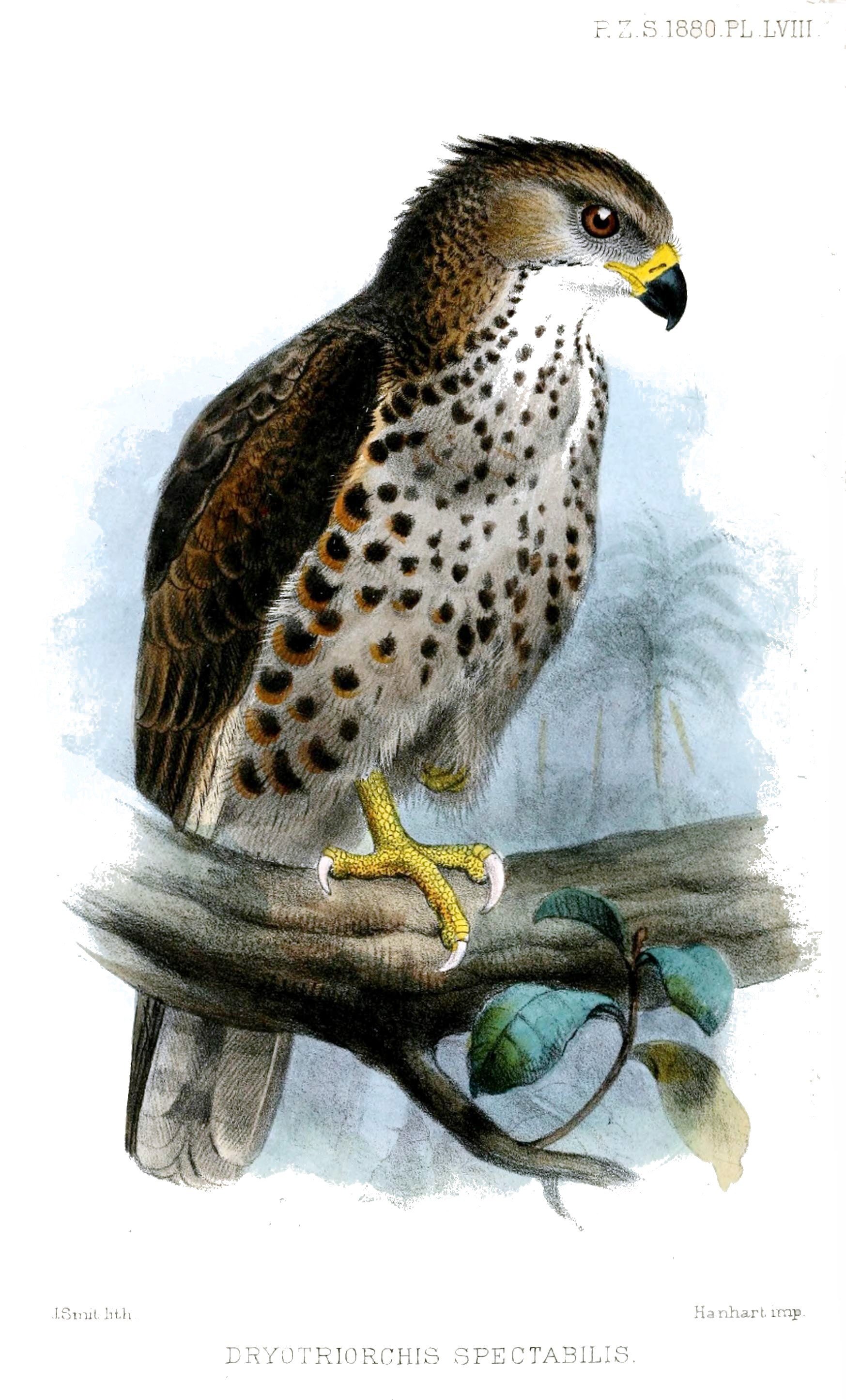

Conservation status
- Least Concern (IUCN 3.1)

Scientific classification
- Kingdom: Animalia
- Phylum: Chordata
- Class: Aves
- Order: Accipitriformes
- Family: Accipitridae
- Subfamily: Circaetinae
- Genus: Circaetus; Shelley, 1874
- Species: C. spectabilis

Binomial name
- Circaetus spectabilis (Schlegel, 1863)

Subspecies
- C. s. spectabilis - (Schlegel, 1863); C. s. batesi - (Sharpe, 1904)
- The distribution of the Congo serpent eagle (orange)

Synonyms
- Astur spectabilis Schlegel, 1863; Dryotriorchis batesi Sharpe, 1904; Circaetus spectabilis

= Congo serpent eagle =

Species of bird

The Congo serpent eagle (Circaetus spectabilis) is a species of bird of prey in the family Accipitridae. This species is distributed across the African tropical rainforest, including upper and lower Guinean forests. This serpent eagle specializes in hunting in these forests' dark understories. It has two subspecies, the nominate subspecies Circaetus spectabilis spectabilis and Circaetus spectabilis batesi. This hawk is a medium-sized bird with distinctive short, rounded wings and a long, rounded tail. It is varying shades of brown on its back and has a slight crest. Its breast is white with variable amounts of a rufous wash and, in the nominate subspecies, is covered in round, blackish spots. The subspecies C. s. batesi only has these dots on its flanks. The Congo serpent eagle closely resembles Cassin's hawk-eagle, and some ornithologists believe that this likeness is a rare example of avian mimicry. It is a very vocal raptor, and often is one of the most heard species in its habitat.

This serpent eagle feeds on snakes, chameleons, and toads, and hunts these species by dropping onto them from a perch in the understory. Its excellent eyesight enables it to hunt in the dark forest. Very little is known about its breeding habits, though it is suspected to breed from June to December. The Congo serpent eagle is listed as a species of Least Concern due to its large range and population. This species has been kept as a pet.

== Taxonomy ==
The Congo serpent eagle was first described in 1863 by Hermann Schlegel as Astur spectabilis from a specimen collected near Elmina, Ghana. Schlegel published his description in Nederlandsch Tijdschrift voor De Dierkunde and placed this species within the goshawks. In 1874 George Ernest Shelley, who had access to more specimens, realized that the species was not a goshawk and moved the species into its own monotypic genus, Dryotriorchis. The Congo serpent eagle is now placed in the genus Circaetus that was introduced in 1816 by the French ornithologist Louis Pierre Vieillot. The syrinx morphology is distinctly like those of accipiter hawks but shows similarities to features found in Nisaetus. Two subspecies are known: the nominate subspecies Circaetus spectabilis spectabilis and C. s. batesi. C. s. batesi was originally described as a separate species, Dryotriorchis batesi, by Richard Bowdler Sharpe in 1904 due to its unspotted breast. Sharpe named the subspecies in honor of G. L. Bates, who shipped him specimens from Cameroon. This species is also known as the West African Serpent eagle and the African Serpent-eagle.

Despite Shelley's reclassification, a large molecular phylogenetic study of the Accipitridae based on sequence capture using ultraconserved elements (UCEs) published in 2024 found that the Congo serpent eagle was embedded in the genus Circaetus.

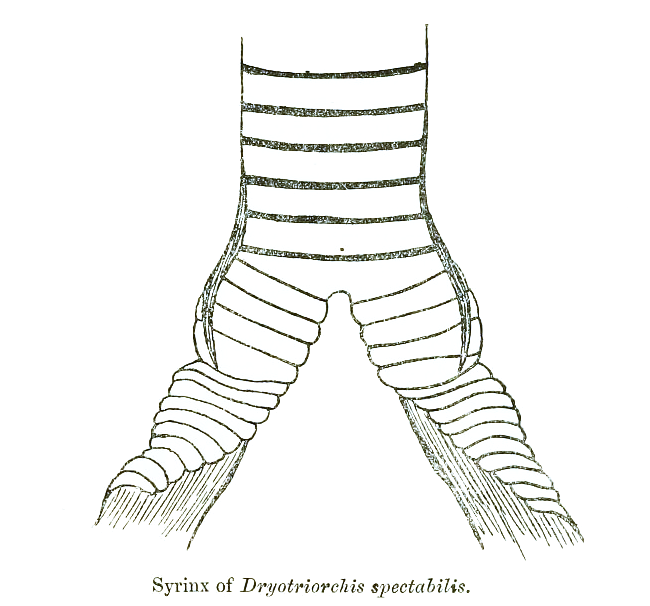
Syrinx morphology

The Congo serpent eagle is superficially similar in plumage and size to Cassin's hawk-eagle, which has an overlapping range with the serpent eagle. It has been suggested that the Congo serpent eagle evolved to mimic the Cassin's hawk-eagle, which could give the serpent eagle several advantages, possibly including the ability to trick its reptilian prey into not fleeing, lowering its own predation, and/or minimizing mobbing by birds through its resemblance to a predator of birds. C. s. spectabilis more closely resembles the immature Cassin's hawk-eagle, while C. s. batesi resembles the adult. This is one of very few suspected examples of avian mimicry.

== Description ==
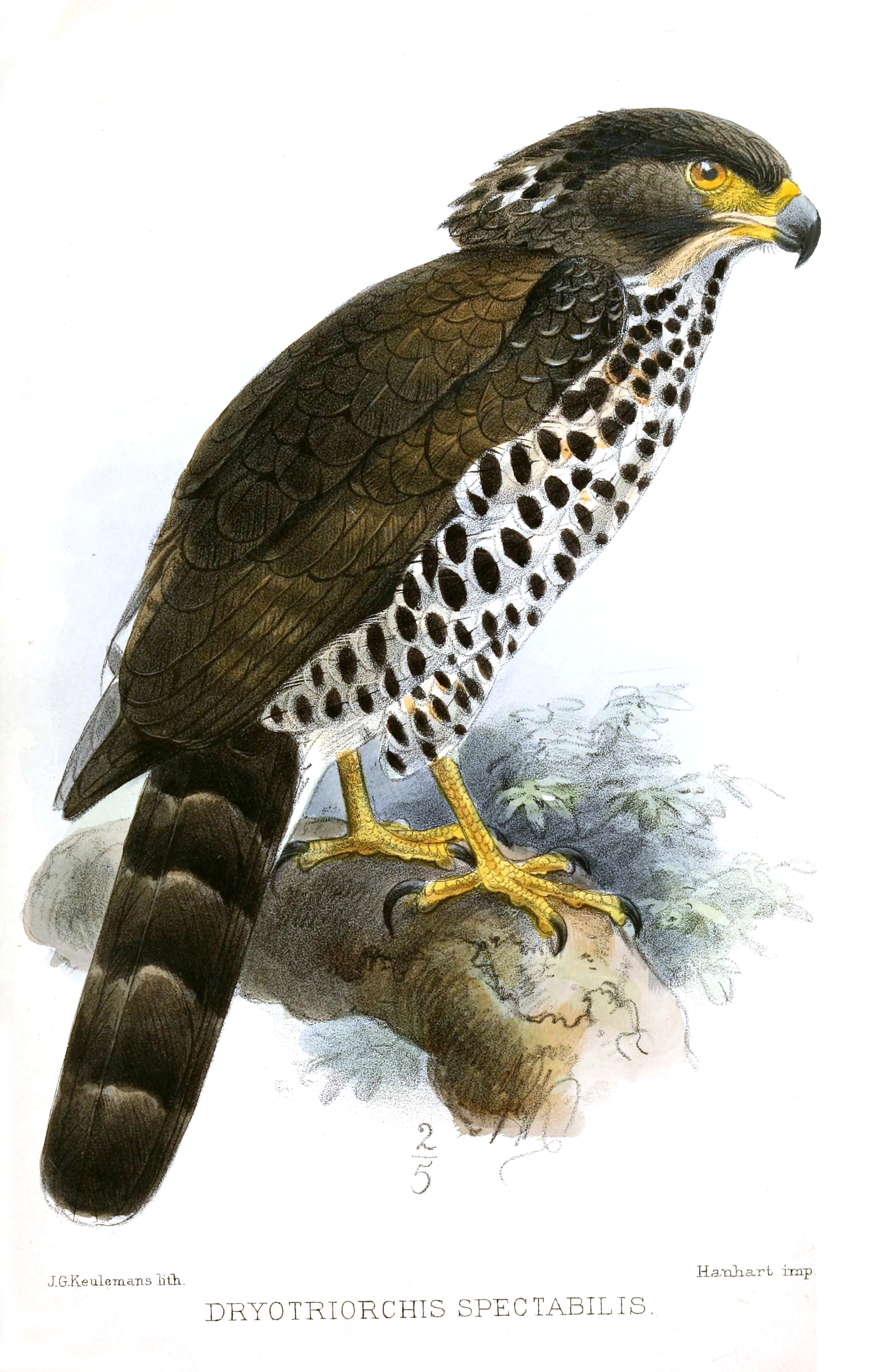
Adult of the nominate subspecies

This hawk is a medium-sized, slender species with short, rounded wings and a long, rounded tail. It is 54 to 60 centimeters (21 to 24 in) long, with the tail contributing 24.5 to 26.8 centimeters (9.6 to 10.6 in). The wingspan is 94 to 106 centimeters (37 to 42 in) across. The adult of the nominate subspecies, Dryotriorchis spectabilis spectabilis, has a blackish-brown crown and upper neck while the sides of the neck and a broad collar are a dark rufous-brown. The feathers on the top of the head are slightly pointed, giving this species a hint of a crest. The remaining upperparts are a dark chocolate brown. The cheeks are light brown while the throat is buffy white with streaks. The eyes are large and dark brown or grey in females and yellow in males while the beak is short but deep. It also has a black median streak. The bird's underparts are white with variable amounts of rufous wash and a number of large, round blackish spots. The serpent eagle's thighs are barred sepia-brown and white, while the undertail is white. The underwing is largely white with some black spots and brown coloration. The tail is light brown, with five to six broad black bars. The claws are short and sharp, while the legs are yellow. Sexes are similar, though the female averages about three percent larger than the male. Immatures have a white crown and mantle, while the upper back has rounded brown or black spots that vanish as the bird ages. The wings and tail are greyish-brown and paler than those of the adults and are more darkly barred.

C. s. batesi is similar to the nominate subspecies, but is browner and paler on the back while the spots on C. s. spectabilis's chest only appear on this subspecies' flanks. The immature does possess a spotted chest, with the spots vanishing as the bird ages.

This is a very vocal raptor and is one of the most frequently heard birds of prey in its range. It makes a cat-like meowing sound as well as a low, mournful, nasal "cow-cow-cow" at intervals over extended periods of time. When heard over a large distance, some ornithologists have compared its call to that of a turaco.

== Distribution and habitat ==
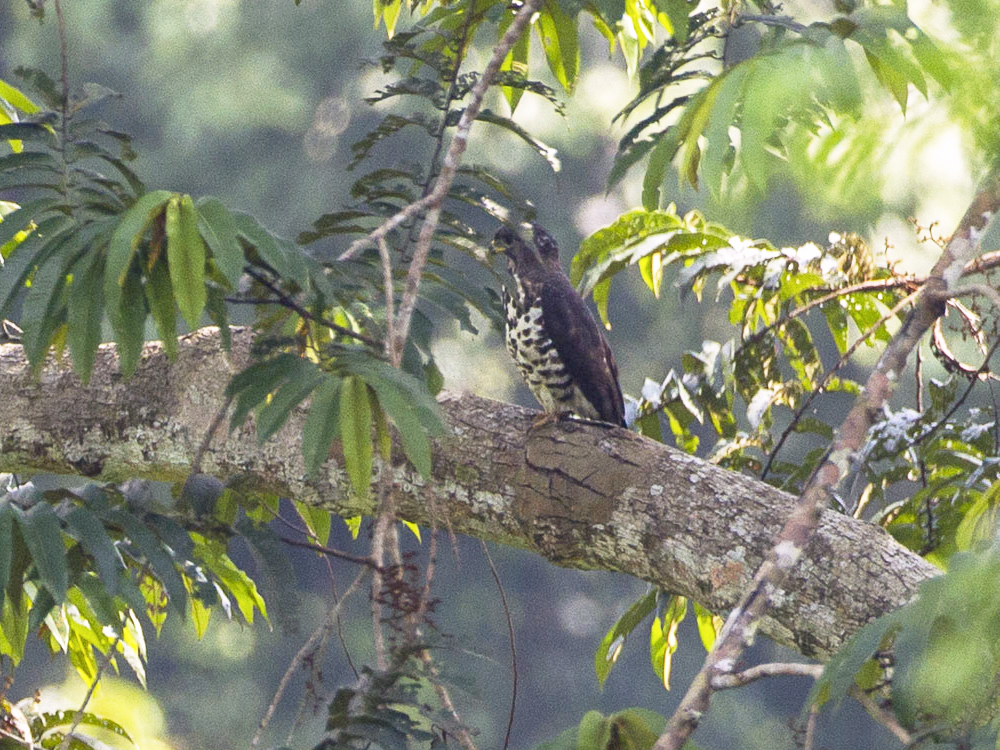
Congo serpent eagle in Ghana.

The Congo serpent eagle lives in southern Sierra Leone and Guinea, Liberia, and southern Côte d'Ivoire and Ghana. It is also found in southern Nigeria and the Central African Republic south through northern and eastern Democratic Republic of the Congo in the east and through Gabon into the northern Republic of the Congo in the west with an isolated population in northern Angola. C. s. spectabilis is found in upper Guinean forests from Liberia to northern Cameroon, while C. s. batesi is found in lower Guinean forests from southern Cameroon through Gabon and western Uganda. Its range covers 2,880,000 square kilometers (1,110,000 sq mi). The species lives in dense primary forest below 900 meters (3,000 ft) in elevation in the dark understory. As it is adapted for dense forest, it is not well-adapted for secondary forests and plantations. The Congo serpent eagle does not migrate, though it is unknown if it is locally nomadic.

== Ecology and behavior ==
Little is known about this species' behavior. The Congo serpent eagle lives in the understory of its habitat and occasionally perches on lower boughs in tall trees. It lives either alone or in pairs. This species is known to hunt snakes, lizards, especially chameleons, toads, and potentially small mammals. It hunts by dropping to the ground from its perch in the understory, where it may strike its prey repeatedly with its feet; this serpent eagle may also grab prey from the foliage while hunting. Its large eyes enable this species to hunt in low light, though it is diurnal. Studies on the species' eyes have shown that they have about two times the visual resolution of a human's. It may breed from October to December in Gabon and from June to November in the Democratic Republic of the Congo.

== Relationship with humans ==
Currently, the Congo serpent eagle's population is dwindling due to deforestation. However, it is listed as a species of Least Concern due to its large population of over 10,000 adults and large range of 2,880,000 square kilometers (1,110,000 sq mi). This species has been kept as a pet and in the 1970s was available from some pet shops. The Congo serpent eagle has been depicted on postage stamps from the Democratic Republic of the Congo and Tanzania.
