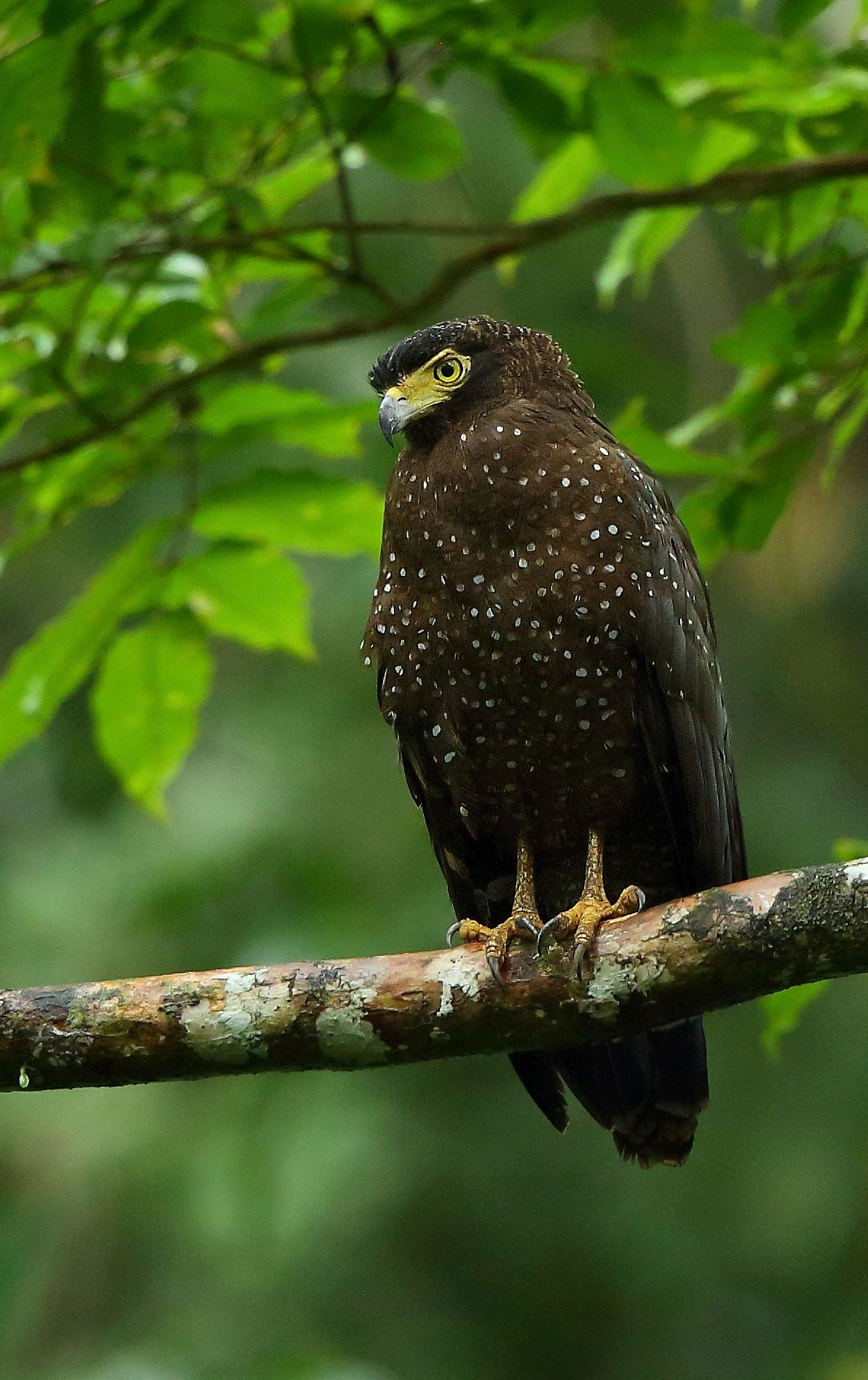

Conservation status
- Vulnerable (IUCN 3.1)

Scientific classification
- Kingdom: Animalia
- Phylum: Chordata
- Class: Aves
- Order: Accipitriformes
- Family: Accipitridae
- Genus: Spilornis
- Species: S. elgini

Binomial name
- Spilornis elgini (Blyth, 1863)

= Andaman serpent eagle =

Eagle species (Spilornis elgini) from the Andaman Islands

The Andaman serpent eagle (Spilornis elgini), also known as the Andaman dark-serpent eagle or the dark serpent eagle, is a medium-sized bird in the family Accipitridae, the raptor family, that is only found in India on the Andaman Islands. It is currently classified as vulnerable and is experiencing population declines. This species, unlike the Crested serpent eagle, is incredibly understudied and so many things about its behaviour and ecology are still widely unknown.

== Taxonomy ==
The genus Spilornis contains six species of serpent eagles, majority of which are island endemics. Serpent eagles are considered Old World birds because they are mostly found in Asia and Africa. In terms of taxonomy, the Andaman serpent eagle was originally thought to be a subspecies of Spilornis cheela before it was determined to be its own species. Since there is no complete taxonomic record for all of the species within Spilornis, it is difficult to determine exact relationships, although it is believed that the Andaman serpent eagle is an out group from the other Spilornis species. This means that the other Spilornis species are more closely related to each other than they are to the Andaman species. However, overall, even though they exhibit some variation, it has been determined that, because they are solely found in the Old World and mostly found on islands and in similar habitats, the species within Spilornis have very little genetic variation between them. This, along with the fact that they inhabit very similar territories, may explain why all of the species within the serpent eagle genus display very similar physical characteristics.

== Description ==
The call of the Andaman serpent eagle consists of three to four short chip-sounding whistles. These birds are nearly entirely dark brown, except for their bright yellow faces and legs and they have spots on the tops of their wings and on their chests. They also have thick black bands on their tails and white and black bands on the underside of their wings. This species also has a hooked beak which is characteristic of a bird of prey and is used to tear apart food. Juvenile Andaman serpent eagles are known to have lighter colouring than adults and they also have a white head. Additionally, there is no sexual dimorphism between males and females, which means that it is impossible to differentiate the two sexes by physical characteristics alone.

== Distribution and habitat ==
The Andaman archipelago includes 204 islands, majority of which are forested, that all surround three main large islands. The Andaman serpent eagle has been found on all of the Andaman Islands, even on the islands with as little area as 0.8 km^{2}, although they prefer larger ones, and have even been known to occupy two different islands at the same time. They are usually found inland in closed canopy evergreen forests, on hillsides and in tropical lowland areas, however they can also be found closer to the coast and on agricultural land. Additionally, this species uses mangrove marshes and creeks as nesting sites. Thus, they have some very specific habitat requirements that need to be met in order to successfully reproduce and these areas are currently being disturbed, which is threatening the species.

=== Population ===
In terms of population density, the Andaman serpent eagle is common within the archipelago it is endemic to, but its population size is actually quite small with fewer than 4000 individuals that are spread amongst various subpopulations. Individuals within this species tend to have a lifespan of 8 years.

== Behaviour and ecology ==
=== Food and feeding ===
As their name suggests, the Andaman serpent eagle consumes snakes as well as other prey such as other birds, rats, frogs and other reptiles. In one study they were even observed to eat crabs and prawns that they could find on the ground. The serpent eagles are known to have thick scales on their legs and short toes and this is believed to help them prey on snakes while avoiding poisonous bites. The Andaman serpent eagle is known to hunt from perches, usually tree branches below the canopy. Once they spot prey from their elevated vantage point, they will swoop down to grab whatever it is they have spotted.

=== Breeding ===
The serpent eagle genus has been known to perform elaborate aerial courtship routines. Aerial courtship displays are not the same for every species, however, for raptorial species, this means both birds will fly together and perform various movements and displays such as locking talons, rolling and diving.

=== Threats or survival ===
The Andaman serpent eagle is currently facing population decline which has been influenced by various threats to the species itself and their habitat.

Threat	Description
Agriculture	Increasing human populations on the islands require more food and therefore, the habitat of the Andaman serpent eagle is being converted into agricultural and grazing land for crops and livestock.
Logging	Since the Andaman islands are known for being heavily forested, they are also of interest to logging companies. This interest is further amplified by the need for more homes and agricultural fields for the increasing human presence. Habitat degradation and fragmentation is a result of these activities.
Hunting and Trapping	The Andaman serpent eagle has been a target of hunting and trapping activities, which directly decreases the population of the species.
Tourism	Tourism is becoming more common on the islands and increased tourism requires infrastructure to support it. This includes airports, hotels, sanitation, roads, etc. The creation of these sites requires the conversion and removal of forested areas that the Andaman serpent eagle relies on.
Exotic Species	The introduction of exotic species can be detrimental to pre-existing populations because they create competition for food and resources. Exotic species often do not have predators in their novel environment, which allows them to outcompete species that are already in the area. The introduction of new bird species, like the common mynah, on the Andaman islands has been observed to threaten the existing, endemic species.

Agriculture, logging practices and tourism are the most dangerous threat for this species currently because they all require the destruction of natural habitat. The Andaman serpent eagles are only found on the Andaman islands and do not migrate elsewhere. This means that they are extremely dependent on the forested habitat and the loss of these habitats may lead to a decrease in reproductive and hunting success which will further harm the population.

=== Relationship to humans ===
This species' main relationship with humans is described in the above section and consists mostly of competition for habitat and consumption.

== Status ==
The Andaman serpent eagle is currently considered vulnerable because it has a relatively small population in a limited habitat. Since the species is battling habitat degradation and encroachment from human movement to the larger islands, and logging, it is expected that their numbers will continue to decline over time. Conservation efforts are underway that consist of monitoring endemic bird species on the Andaman islands, additionally, education initiatives are being set up and essential habitat areas have been identified. Since this species has not been researched thoroughly, more in depth studies into behaviour and population numbers may be beneficial to inform on how best to conserve the species.

== Gallery ==
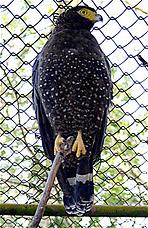
An Adult Andaman Serpent Eagle
