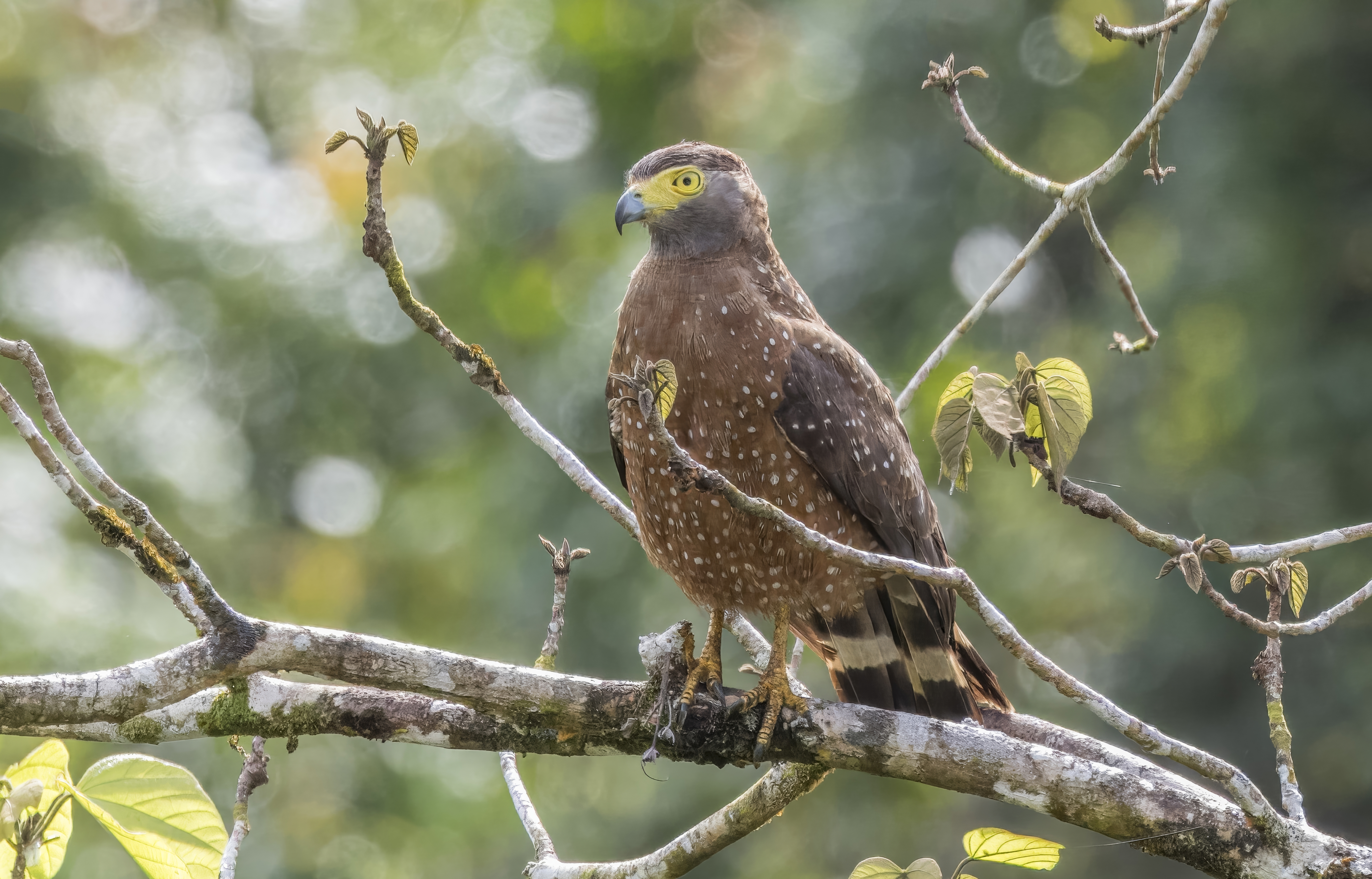
- On Bohol Island

Conservation status
- Least Concern (IUCN 3.1)

Scientific classification
- Kingdom: Animalia
- Phylum: Chordata
- Class: Aves
- Order: Accipitriformes
- Family: Accipitridae
- Genus: Spilornis
- Species: S. holospilus

Binomial name
- Spilornis holospilus (Vigors, 1831)

= Philippine serpent eagle =

Species of bird

The Philippine serpent eagle (Spilornis holospilus) is an eagle found in the major islands of the Philippines. It is sometimes treated as a race of the crested serpent eagle (Spilornis cheela). This species is usually found in forest clearings, open woodlands, and sometimes in cultivated lands with scattered trees. It is endemic to the Philippines. The species is found on most part of the major islands, except for Palawan.

It is illegal to hunt, capture or possess Philippine serpent eagles under Philippine Law RA 9147.

== Description and taxonomy ==
It has a length of 47 to 53 cm and a wingspan of 105 to 120 cm. This species is monotypic.

== Ecology and behavior ==
The bird feeds on amphibians, reptiles and other live prey. Not much is known about its breeding habits. A female was collected with a single egg in its oviducts in April of 2020.

== Habitat and conservation status ==
Its natural habitats are tropical moist lowland forest, montane forest, second growth and cultivated areas up to 2,500 meters above sea level.

The IUCN has classified the species as being of Least Concern as it has a large range and it is common throughout its range and appears to adapt to second growth. Populations are still declining due to habitat loss due to slash and burn farming, mining, illegal logging and habitat conversion, hunting and poaching for the illegal wildlife trade.

It is found in multiple protected areas such as Pasonanca Natural Park, Bataan National Park, Mount Banahaw, Mount Kitanglad. Mount Apo, Pasonanca Natural Park and Northern Sierra Madre Natural Park but like all areas in the Philippines, protection is lax and deforestation continues despite this protection on paper.
