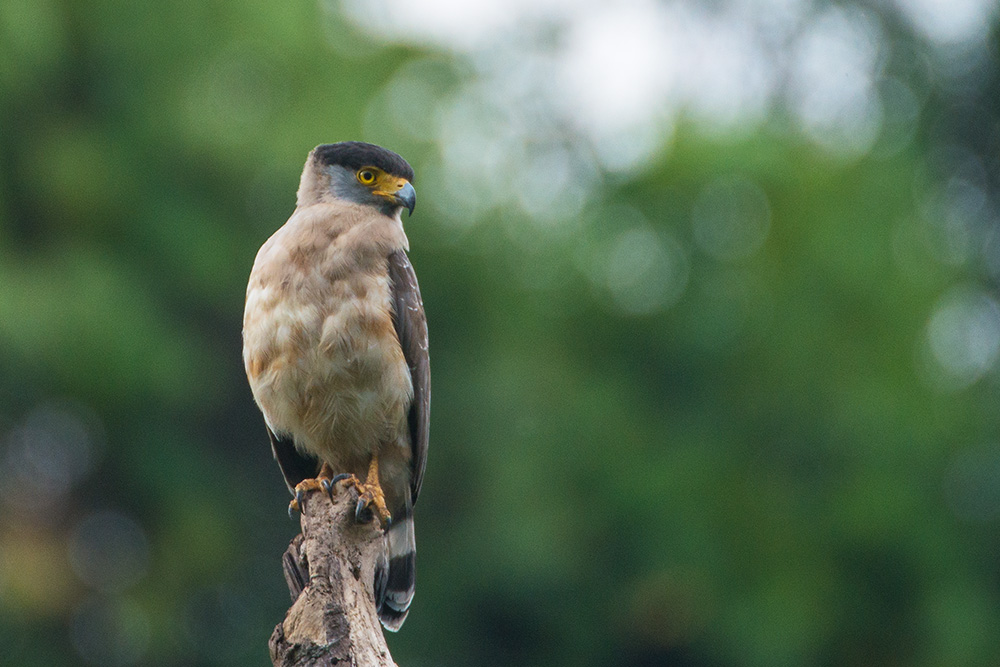

Conservation status
- Endangered (IUCN 3.1)

Scientific classification
- Kingdom: Animalia
- Phylum: Chordata
- Class: Aves
- Order: Accipitriformes
- Family: Accipitridae
- Genus: Spilornis
- Species: S. klossi

Binomial name
- Spilornis klossi Richmond, 1902
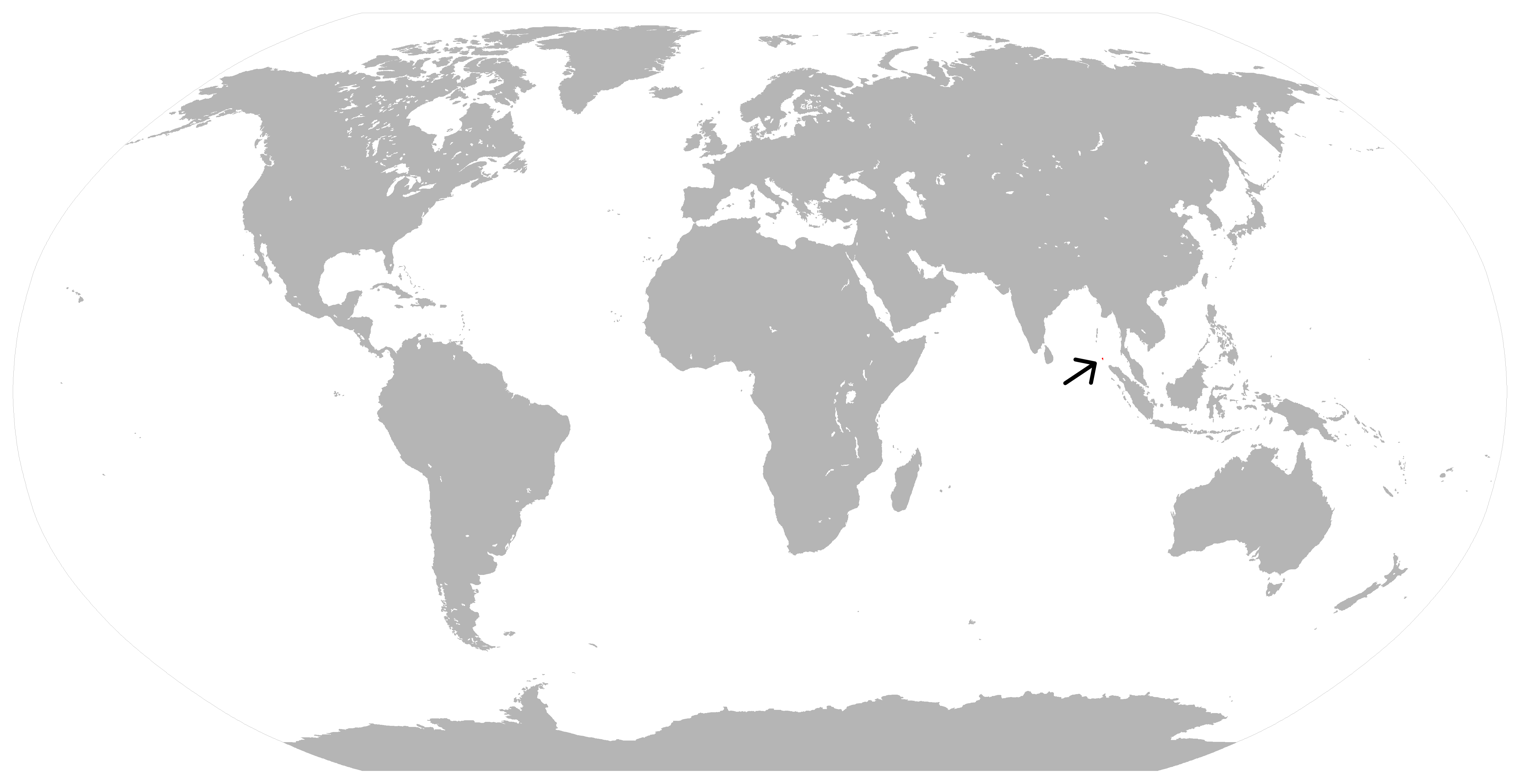

= Great Nicobar serpent eagle =

Species of bird

The Great Nicobar serpent eagle (Spilornis klossi), also known as the South Nicobar serpent eagle, is a species of bird of prey in the family Accipitridae. It is probably the smallest known eagle, with a weight of about 450 g (0.99 lb), a wingspan of 85 to 95 cm (33 to 37 in) and a body length of about 38 to 42 cm (15 to 17 in). It is endemic to forest on the Indian island of Great Nicobar. It is threatened by habitat loss.

All major authorities now treat the Great Nicobar serpent eagle as a species, but in the past it was sometimes considered a subspecies of S. minimus. Today S. minimus is either considered a subspecies of the crested serpent eagle or a monotypic species from the central Nicobar Islands, the Central Nicobar serpent eagle.
