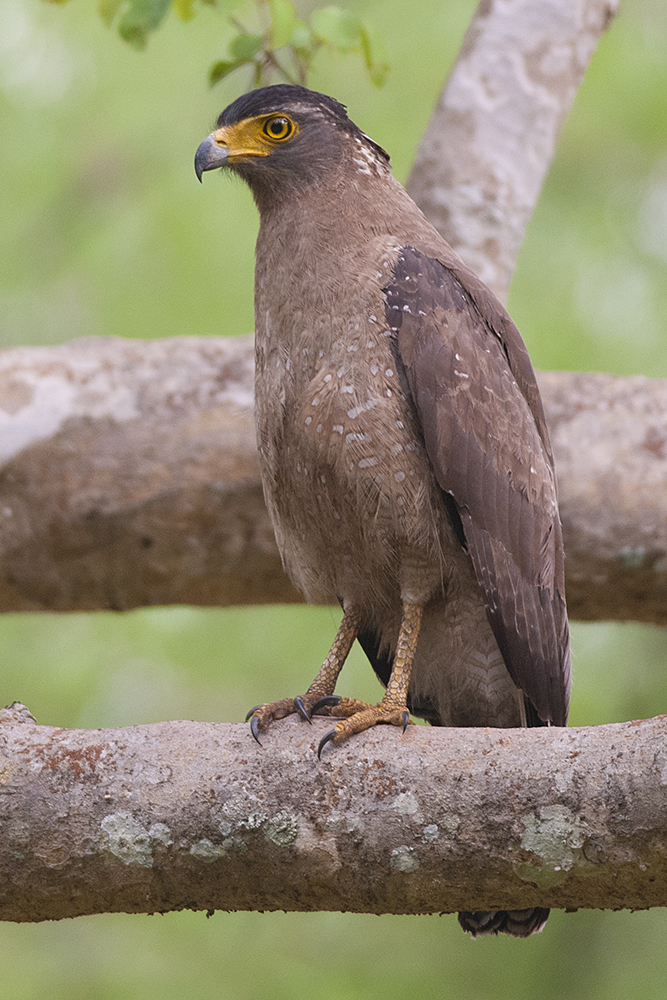
- Adult crested serpent eagle in Bandipur National Park

Conservation status
- Least Concern (IUCN 3.1)

Scientific classification
- Kingdom: Animalia
- Phylum: Chordata
- Class: Aves
- Order: Accipitriformes
- Family: Accipitridae
- Genus: Spilornis
- Species: S. cheela

Binomial name
- Spilornis cheela (Latham, 1790)

Audio
- Call of subspecies melanotis

= Crested serpent eagle =

Species of Bird from tropical Asia

The crested serpent eagle (Spilornis cheela) is a medium-sized bird of prey that is found in forested habitats across tropical Asia. Within its widespread range across the Indian subcontinent, Southeast Asia and East Asia, there are considerable variations and some authorities prefer to treat several of its subspecies as completely separate species. In the past, several species including the Philippine serpent eagle (S. holospila), Andaman serpent eagle (S. elgini) and South Nicobar serpent eagle (S. klossi) were treated as subspecies of the crested serpent eagle. All members within the species complex have a large-looking head with long feathers on the back, giving them a maned and crested appearance. The face is bare and yellow joining up with the ceres while the powerful feet are unfeathered and heavily scaled. They fly over the forest canopy on broad wings and tail have wide white and black bars. They call often with a loud, piercing and familiar three or two-note call. They often feed on snakes, giving them their name and are placed along with the Circaetus snake-eagles in the subfamily Circaetinae.

== Description ==
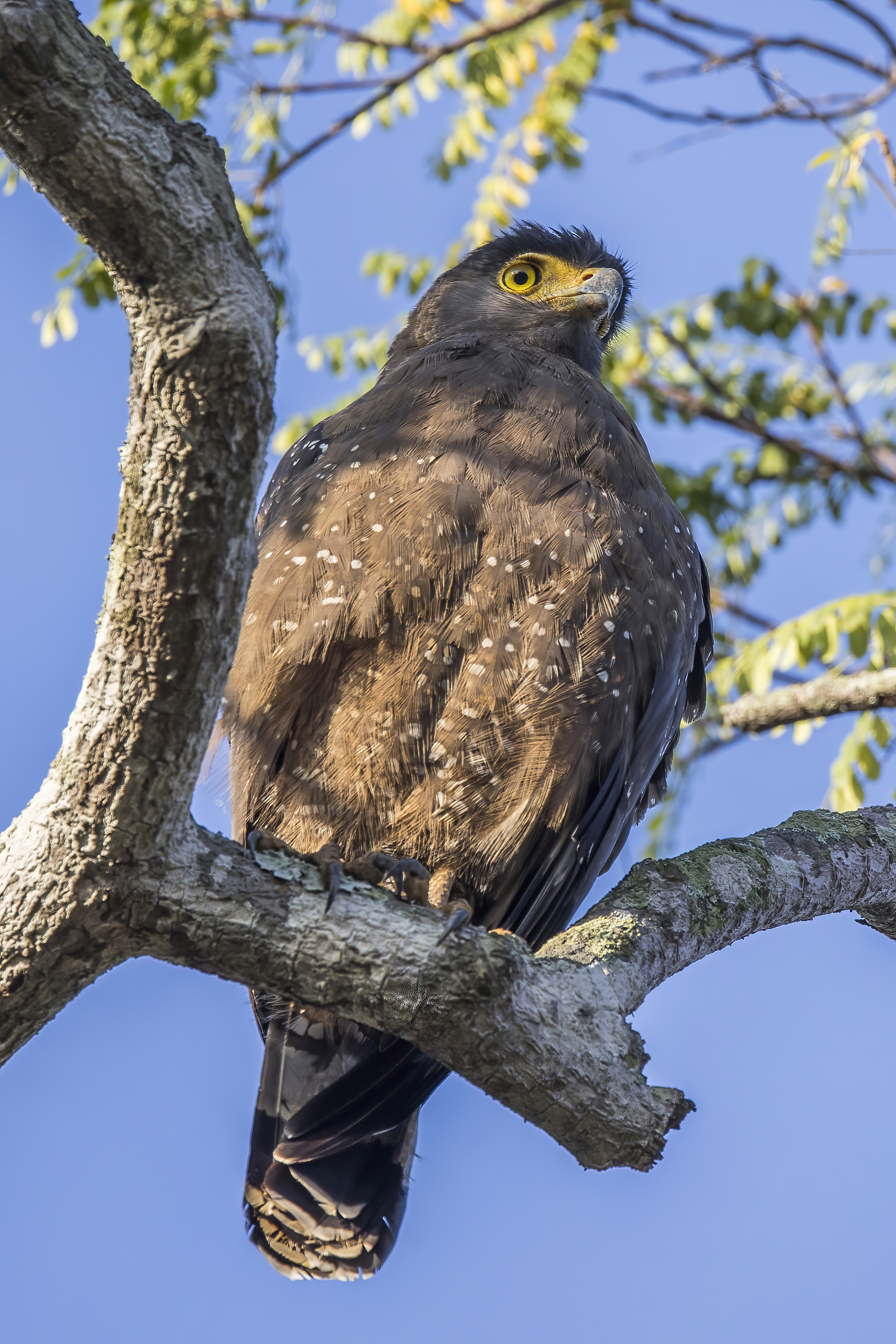
S. c, spilogaster Yala National Park, Sri Lanka

This medium-large, dark brown eagle is stocky, with rounded wings and a short tail. Its short black and white fan-shaped nuchal crest gives it a thick-necked appearance. The bare facial skin and feet are yellow. The underside is spotted with white and yellowish-brown. When perched the wing tips do not reach until the tail tip. In soaring flight, the broad and paddle-shaped wings are held in a shallow V. The tail and underside of the flight feathers are black with broad white bars. Young birds show a lot of white on the head. The tarsus is unfeathered and covered by hexagonal scales. The upper mandible does not have an overhanging festoon to the tip.

=== Size ===
This species of serpent eagle manifests an unusual amount of size variation across its assorted subspecies. Total length of fully-grown crested serpent eagles can vary from 41 to 75 cm (16 to 30 in) and wingspan can vary from 89 to 169 cm (2 ft 11 in to 5 ft 7 in). The largest proportioned race appears to be the nominate, S. c. cheela, with a wing chord of 468 to 510 mm (18.4 to 20.1 in) in males and 482 to 532 mm (19.0 to 20.9 in) in females, tail lengths of 295 to 315 mm (11.6 to 12.4 in) and tarsus length of 100 to 115 mm (3.9 to 4.5 in). In comparison, S. c. minimus, probably the smallest race, has a wing chord of 257 to 291 mm (10.1 to 11.5 in) in males and 288 to 304 mm (11.3 to 12.0 in) in females, tail lengths of around 191 mm (7.5 in) and tarsal length of around 76 mm (3.0 in). Weights are more fitfully reported but are estimated to vary perhaps threefold between assorted races. In very small subspecies such as S. c. asturinus body masses were found to be 420 g (15 oz) in a male and 565 g (19.9 oz) in a female. In S. c. palawanesis, body mass was reported at 688 g (24.3 oz) in males and 853 g (30.1 oz) in females. Serpent eagles from Borneo, S. c. pallidus, may between 625 and 1,130 g (22.0 and 39.9 oz). Mainland forms are typically larger but a weight of 900 g (32 oz) was cited for the fairly small mainland race, S. c. burmanicus. In the race S. c. hoya, weights were much higher, averaging 1,207 g (42.6 oz); meanwhile, in the same race, 8 males averaged 1,539 g (54.3 oz) and 6 females averaged 1,824 g (64.3 oz). In some cases, serpent eagles may attain estimated weights of approximately 2,300 g (81 oz).

== Taxonomy ==
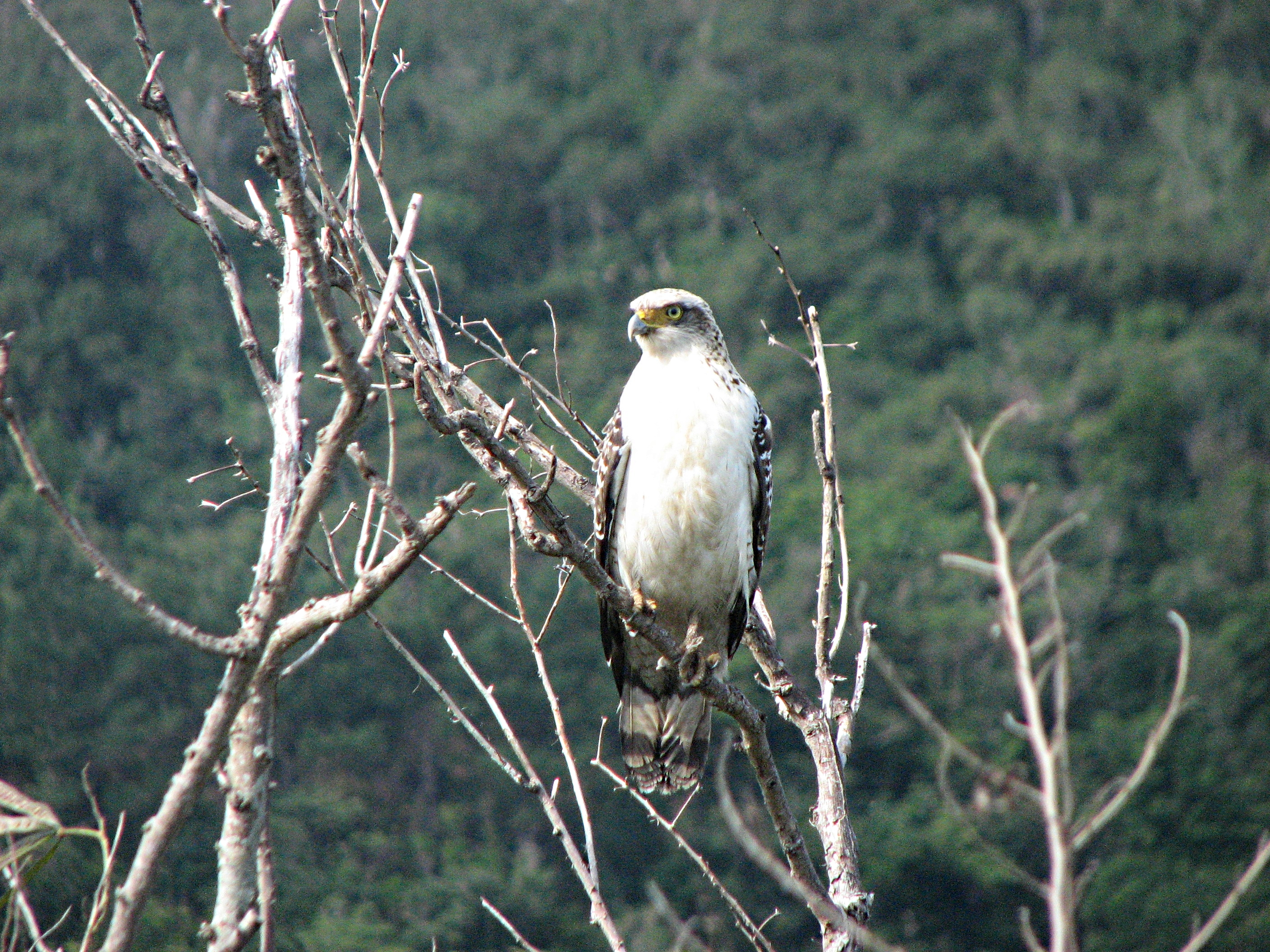
Immature S. c. perplexus Iriomote, Okinawa

The crested serpent eagle is placed along with the snake eagles of the genus Circaetus in the subfamily Circaetinae.

The nominate subspecies has a black throat while the peninsular Indian form has a brownish throat. There are clinal latitudinal variations, with size decreasing southward. The small islands taxa are generally smaller in size than the taxa from the Asian mainland/larger islands in a phenomenon termed as insular dwarfism. Within its widespread range across tropical Asia, 21 subspecies have been proposed:

- S. c. batu from southern Sumatra and Batu,
- S. c. bido from Java and Bali,
- S. c. burmanicus in most of Indochina,
- S. c. hoya from Taiwan,
- S. c. malayensis of the Thai-Malay Peninsula and northern Sumatra,
- S. c. melanotis in Peninsular India,
- S. c. palawanensis from Palawan,
- S. c. pallidus from northern Borneo,
- S. c. richmondi from southern Borneo,
- S. c. ricketti in northern Vietnam and southern China,
- S. c. rutherfordi from Hainan, and
- S. c. spilogaster of Sri Lanka.

The remaining sub-species are all restricted to smaller islands:

- S. c. abbotti (Simeulue serpent eagle) from Simeulue,
- S. c. asturinus (Nias serpent eagle) from Nias,
- S. c. baweanus (Bawean serpent eagle) of the Bawean,
- S. c. davisoni in the Andamans,
- S. c. minimus (Central Nicobar serpent eagle) from the central Nicobars,
- S. c. natunensis (Natuna serpent eagle) from Natuna,
- S. c. perplexus (Ryukyu serpent eagle) from southern Ryukyu (Iriomote I. and Ishigaki I.), and
- S. c. sipora (Mentawai serpent eagle) from Mentawai.

The last seven (with English names in brackets) are sometimes treated as separate species. Although the crested serpent eagle remains widespread and fairly common overall, some of the taxa that are restricted to small islands are believed to have relatively small populations that likely are in the hundreds.

The rarest is probably the Bawean serpent eagle with a declining population of about 26–37 pairs, which makes it critically endangered.

== Behaviour and ecology ==
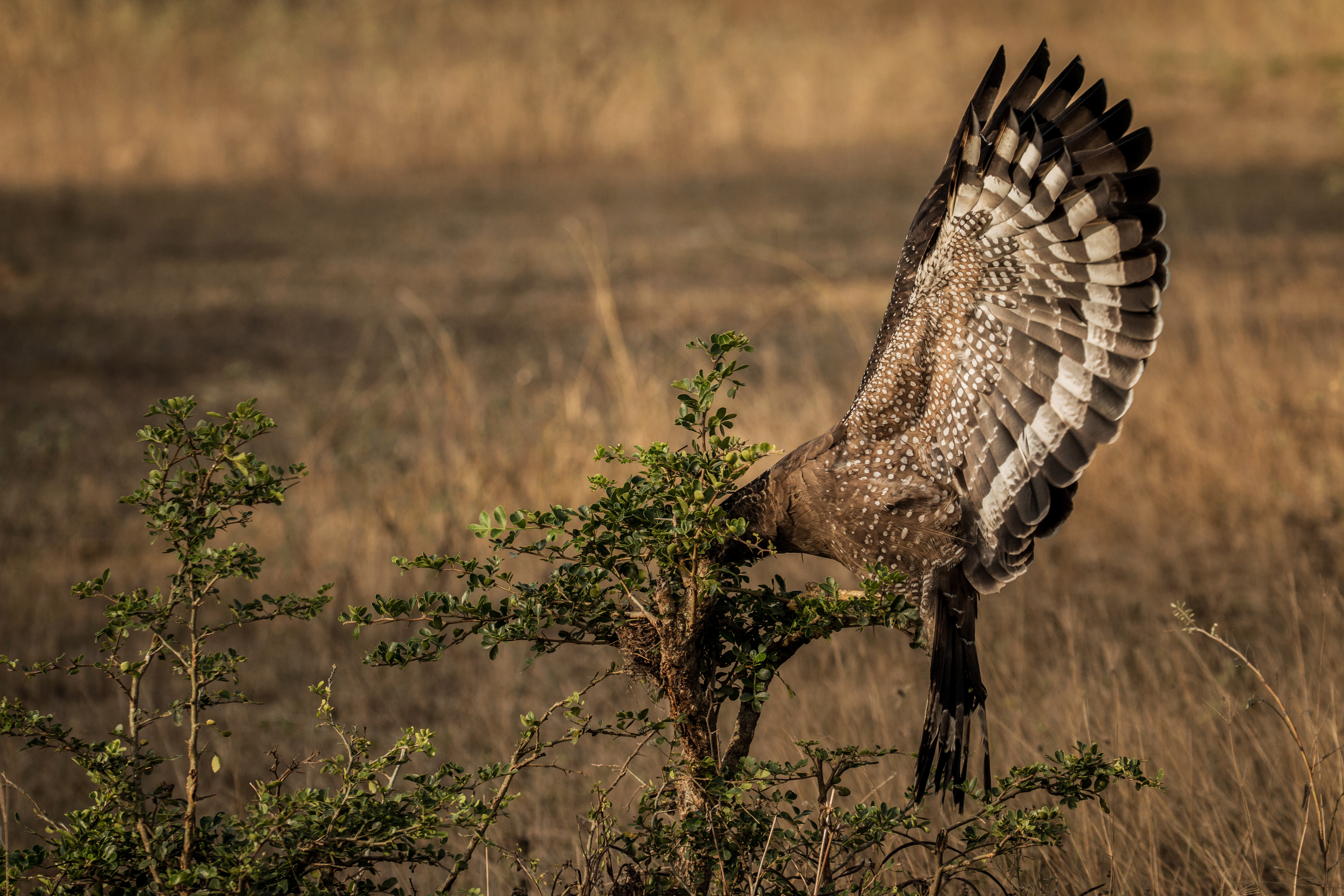
Crested serpent eagle

The crested serpent eagle is a reptile eater which hunts over forests, often close to wet grassland, for snakes and lizards. It has also been observed to prey on birds, large insects like grasshoppers or locusts, amphibians, mammals, fishes, termites and large earthworms. It is found mainly over areas with thick vegetation both on the low hills and the plains. This species is a resident species, but in some parts of their range they are found only in summer.

The call is a distinctive kluee-wip-wip with the first note being high and rising. They call a lot in the late mornings from their perches where they spend a lot of time and they rise on thermals in the mornings. In southern Taiwan, males have a larger home range than females. Males on average had a home range of 16.7 km^{2} while females used about 7 km^{2}. When alarmed, they erect the crest and the head appears large and framed by the ruff. They will sometimes follow snakes on the ground. They roost in the interiors of trees with dense foliage. A radio-telemetric study of the species in Taiwan found that the birds spend 98% of the day perched and usually finding food in the morning hours. They appear to use a sit and wait foraging strategy.

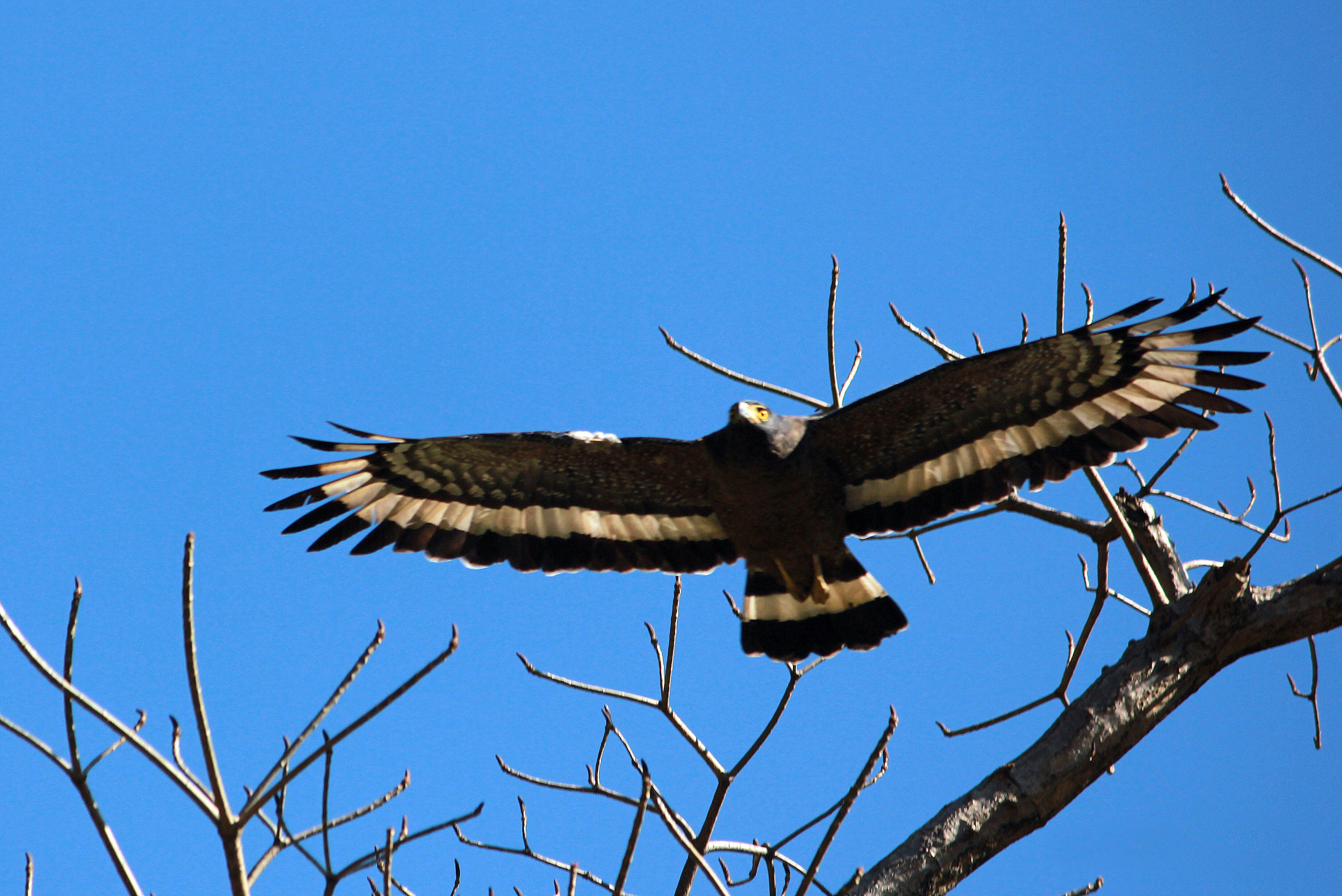
In flight the wide white band is distinctive

The breeding season begins in late winter when they start courting and establishing territories. The eggs are laid in early summer. Old nests are often refurbished and reused in India but a study in Penang found them to build fresh nests each year. A study in India found that most nests were built along riverine trees. The nest is a large platform built high on a tree. Both birds in a pair build the nest but the female alone incubates. The male guards when the female forages. In central India, the Terminalia tomentosa is often used while Terminalia bellirica and Dalbergia latifolia was often used in southern India. In Penang, the nest trees were typically large and isolated from other trees with lot of room for the birds to fly in and out. The nests are lined with green leaves collected from nearby and are placed facing down on the nest floor. The usual clutch is one egg but two are sometimes laid and only a single chick is successfully raised in a season. When eggs are lost, a replacement is laid two to seven weeks later. The eggs hatch after about 41 days and the young fledge after about two months. Nests are defended by the parents.

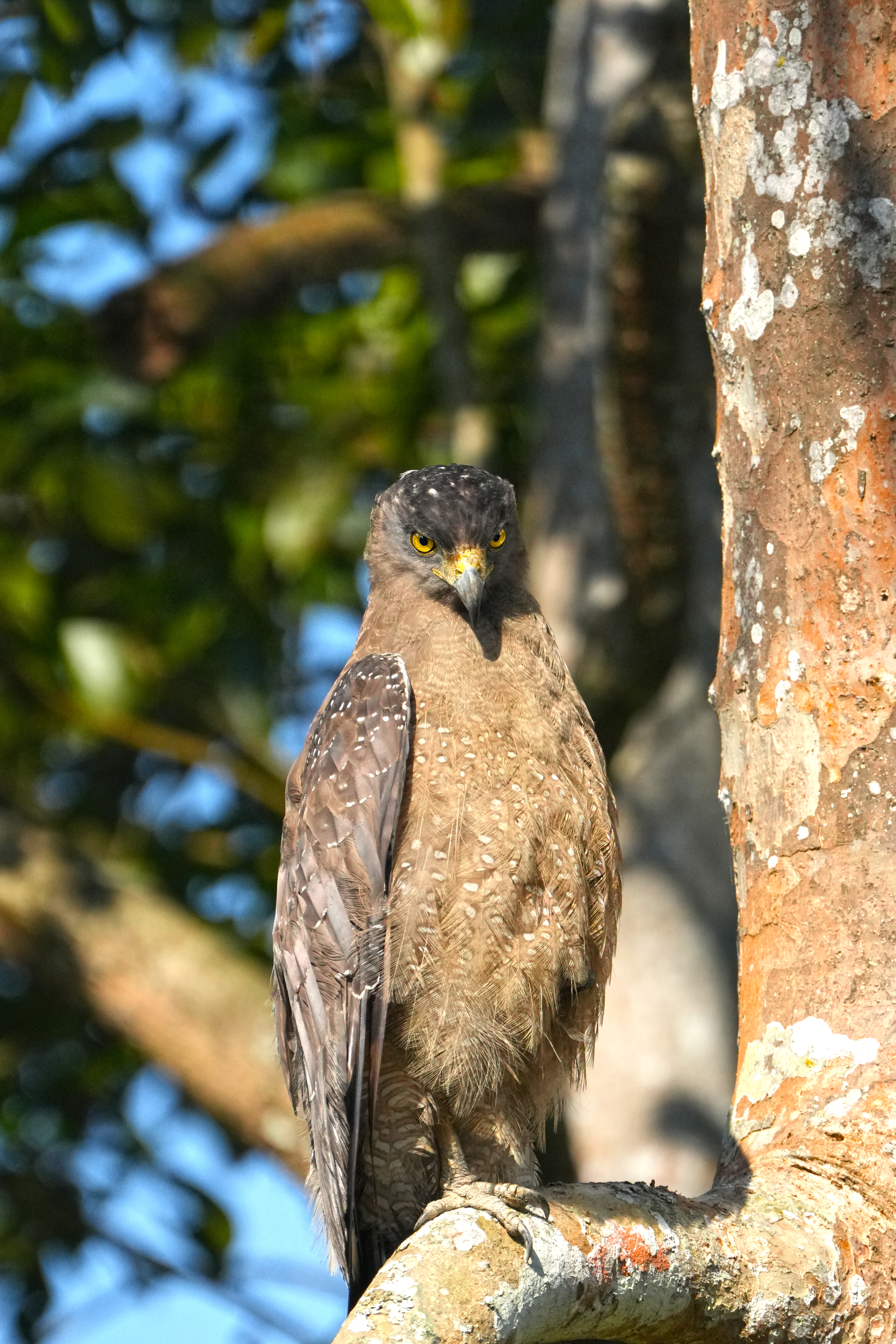
The crested serpent eagle at Kaziranga National Park

Several species of endoparasitic nematodes have been recovered from the intestines of crested serpent eagles, including Madelinema angelae. Avian pox virus infections which cause warts on the face have been observed in a wild bird living in Taiwan. A number of ectoparasitic bird lice have been described from the species including Kurodaia cheelae. In Penang, it was found that cinereous tits (Parus cinereus ambiguus) tended to nest close to nesting crested serpent eagles, presumably due to safety from predators like crows that may be driven off by the eagles. They have also been found to visit the nests of the eagles to collect fur from the remains of dead mammals.
