= Minister Plenipotentiary of Suriname =

Former minister of government of Suriname

The Minister Plenipotentiary of Suriname (Dutch: Gevolmachtigde Minister van Suriname) represented the constituent country of Suriname in the Council of Ministers of the Kingdom of the Netherlands. It has existed from 1954 until the Independence of Suriname on 25 November 1975.

A significant difference between the Netherlands ministers and the Ministers Plenipotentiary is that the former ministers are accountable for their politics and policies to the Dutch parliament. The Ministers Plenipotentiary, however, are accountable to their national governments, which was the Estates of Suriname in case of Suriname. Therefore, the Ministers Plenipotentiary usually do not resign in the event of a Dutch cabinet crisis.

== History ==
In November 1947, Raymond Pos was appointed deputy to represent Suriname. A better representation was needed, and in January 1949, a commission was established with Henry Lucien de Vries as commissioner. In 1954, the Charter for the Kingdom of the Netherlands established the Netherlands, Suriname, and Netherlands Antilles as constituent countries within the Kingdom.

== List of ministers plenipotentiary of Suriname ==
The following table lists the ministers plenipotentiary of Suriname that have been in office until independence.

Name	Period	Party	ref
Raymond Pos	29 December 1954–1 August 1963	Independent	
Severinus Emanuels	1 August 1963–31 December 1964	National Party of Suriname	
Jo Einaar	18 November 1965–1 July 1968	Independent	
Walter Lim A Po	1 July 1968–1 January 1970	National Party of Suriname	
Desi Polanen	1 January 1970–1 April 1974	Progressive National Party	
Wim van Eer	1 April 1974–25 November 1975	National Party of Suriname	
