= Kingdom act =

A Kingdom Act (Dutch: Rijkswet) is an act of the Kingdom of the Netherlands, which scope goes beyond the constituent country the Netherlands, and which is (also) effective in the other constituent countries Aruba, Curaçao and/or Sint Maarten. Kingdom Acts are used for specific areas of law set out in the Charter for the Kingdom of the Netherlands (e.g. nationality law, foreign affairs), or for those areas where countries in the Kingdom of the Netherlands cooperate voluntarily.

== Field of application ==
=== Ordinary Kingdom Acts ===
Kingdom Acts are used in areas defined as Kingdom Affairs in the Charter for the Kingdom:

- maintenance of the independence and the defence of the Kingdom of the Netherlands;
- foreign relations;
- Netherlands nationality;
- regulation of the orders of chivalry, the flag and the coat of arms of the Kingdom;
- regulation of the nationality of vessels and the standards required for the safety and navigation of seagoing vessels flying the flag of the Kingdom of the Netherlands, with the exception of sailing ships;
- supervision of the general rules governing the admission and expulsion of Netherlands nationals;
- general conditions for the admission and expulsion of aliens;
- extradition.

One additional Kingdom Affair is specified in article 43(2) of the Charter:

- The safeguarding of fundamental human rights and freedoms, legal certainty and good governance shall be a Kingdom Affair.

An example of a Kingdom Act is the Kingdom Act on the Netherlands Nationality.

=== Consensus Kingdom Acts ===
On the basis of article 38 of the Charter, the countries of the Kingdom can decide to adopt a Kingdom Act outside of the scope of the aforementioned areas. Such acts are referred to as Consensus Kingdom Acts, as they require the consent of the parliaments of Aruba, Curaçao and Sint Maarten (before 2010: Aruba and the Netherlands Antilles; before 1986: the Netherlands Antilles; from 1954 to 1975: Suriname and the Netherlands Antilles).

An example of a Consensus Kingdom Act is the Kingdom Act on Financial Supervision of the Constituent Countries Curaçao and Sint Maarten, which was adopted as part of the package of legislation pertaining to the dissolution of the Netherlands Antilles.

== Legislative process ==
Kingdom Acts are generally proposed by the Government of the Netherlands, after discussion in the Council of Ministers of the Kingdom (which consists of the Council of Ministers of the Netherlands together with the ministers-plenipotentiary of Aruba, Curaçao and Sint Maarten respectively). Obligatory advice is obtained from the Council of State of the Kingdom (which is the Council of State of the Netherlands, with added advisers, one for every other country). After this advice a (revised) proposal is sent to the States-General of the Netherlands and the estates of the three other countries. When Aruba, Curaçao or Sint Maarten does not agree with the proposed Kingdom Act, then the country can increase the majority needed for approval in the States-General to 5/9 of the votes. After approval in both houses of the States-General, the Act receives royal assent. In the case of Consensus Kingdom Acts, the act also has to be approved by the Estates of the relevant other countries.
