= François Haverschmidt =

François Haverschmidt may refer to:

- Piet Paaltjens, the pseudonym of Dutch writer François Haverschmidt (1835–1894)
- François Haverschmidt (ornithologist) (1906–1987), Dutch ornithologist and judge in Suriname
