= Jo Einaar =

Surinamese teacher and diplomat

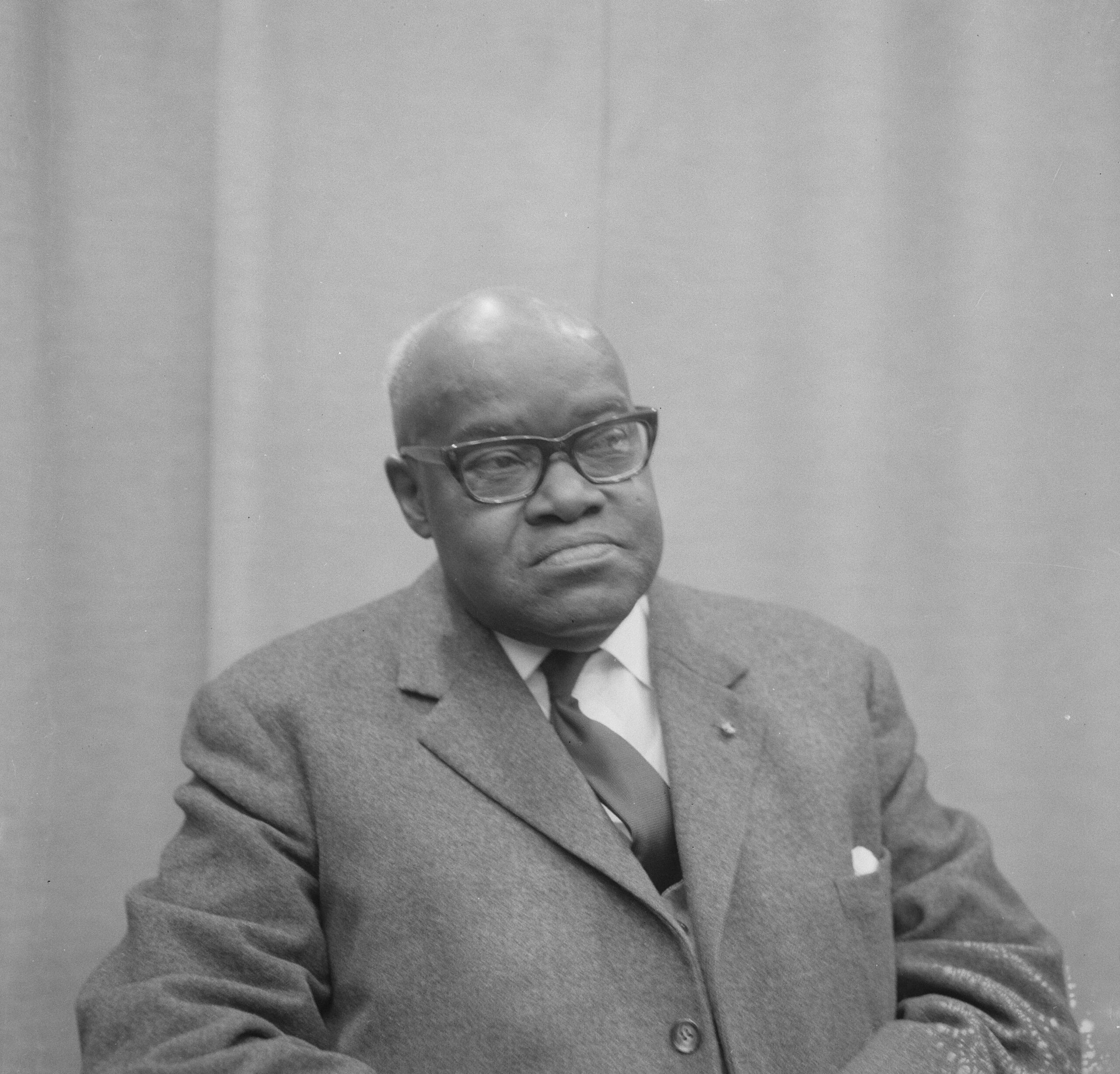
- Einaar (1965)

Minister Plenipotentiary of Suriname
- In office 18 November 1965 – 1 July 1968
- Preceded by: Severinus Emanuels
- Succeeded by: Walter Lim A Po

Personal details
- Born: Johan Friedrich Egbert Einaar; 1 January 1896; Paramaribo, Surinam
- Died: 20 October 1977 (aged 81); Beneden-Leeuwen, Netherlands
- Profession: teacher, diplomat

Johan Friedrich Egbert "Jo" Einaar (1 January 1896 – 20 October 1977) was a Surinamese teacher and diplomat. He was an anthropology professor at Howard University in Washington DC, Dutch Consul General in New York City, and served as Minister Plenipotentiary of Suriname from 18 November 1965 until 1 July 1968.

== Biography ==
Einaar was born in Paramaribo on 1 January 1896. After finishing high school, he became a teacher. In 1919, he left for the Netherlands, and studied at a trade school in Amsterdam while working for an insurance company. In 1927, he studied history at Leiden University, and obtained his doctorate in 1935 on a thesis about the British rule of Surinam between 1804 and 1816.

Einaar returned to Suriname before World War II. In 1939, he was elected to the Colonial Estates of Suriname. In 1945, Einaar left for the United States to perform anthropological research for the Northwestern University. The same year, he became professor Anthropology at Howard University in Washington DC.

Einaar was the first Surinamese person to become a member of the Dutch diplomatic service, and in 1949, was appointed Consul for Suriname in New York City. Later, he became Consul General for the Netherlands in New York City. In 1960, Einaar retired, and became Director of the Cabinet of the Minister Plenipotentiary of Suriname in The Hague on 1 February 1961.

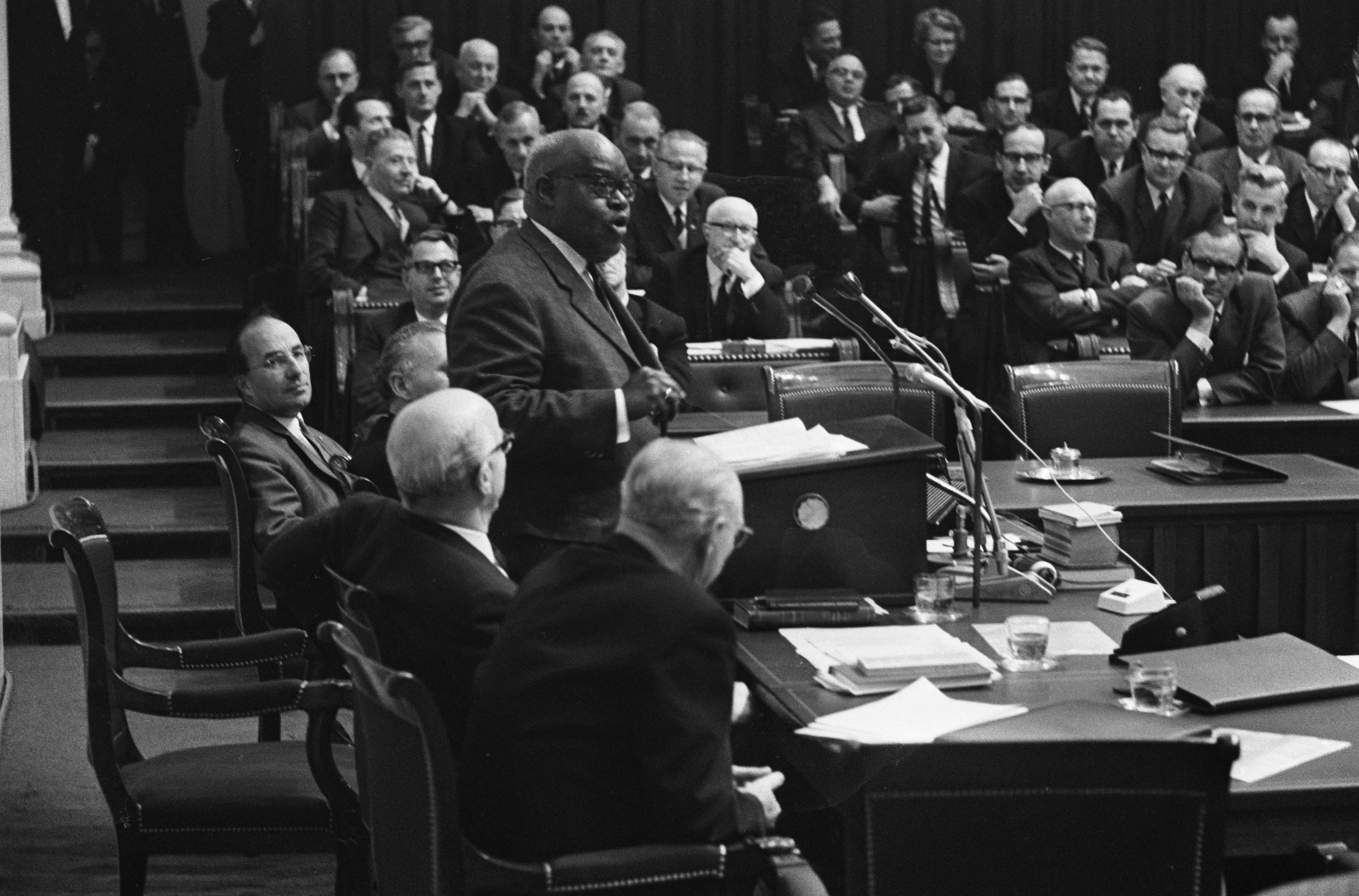
Einaar during the debate (10 November 1965)

On 18 November 1965, Einaar was appointed Minister Plenipotentiary of Suriname, and had been acting minister since 1 January. The Minister Plenipotentiary represented Suriname in the Council of Ministers, and is allowed to address the House of Representatives. Princess Beatrix announced her engagement to Prince Claus. On 10 November, the States General of the Netherlands had to approve the marriage and the naturalisation of Prince Claus. The televised and heated debate focused on Claus' past in Nazi Germany even though he had seen no combat. During the debate, Einaar took the microphone, and delivered a passionate plea to allow the marriage of two people who love each other. The marriage was approved with 132 votes in favour and 9 against. Einaar later received his first fan mail. He served until 1 July 1968, and became President Curator of the University of Suriname.

Einaar died on 21 October 1977 in Beneden-Leeuwen, Netherlands, at the age of 81.
