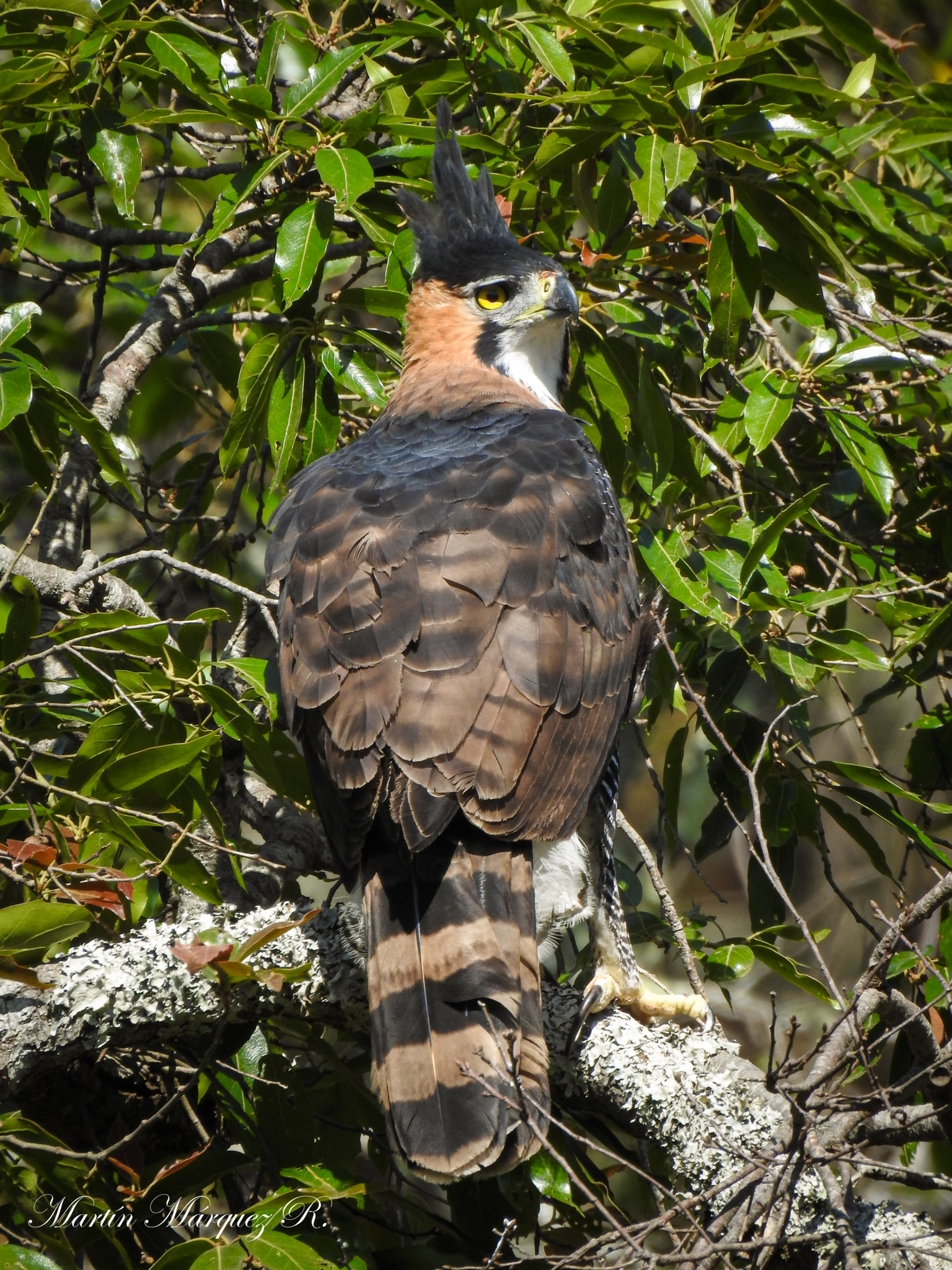

Conservation status
- Near Threatened (IUCN 3.1)

Scientific classification
- Kingdom: Animalia
- Phylum: Chordata
- Class: Aves
- Order: Accipitriformes
- Family: Accipitridae
- Genus: Spizaetus
- Species: S. ornatus

Binomial name
- Spizaetus ornatus (Daudin, 1800)

Subspecies
- S. o. vicarius – Friedmann, 1935; S. o. ornatus – (Daudin, 1800)

= Ornate hawk-eagle =

Species of bird

The ornate hawk-eagle (Spizaetus ornatus) is a bird of prey from the tropical Americas. Formerly, some authorities referred to this species as the crested hawk-eagle, a name that may cause some confusion as it is more commonly used for an Asian eagle species. Like all eagles, it is in the family Accipitridae. This species has a feathered tarsus that marks it as a member of the Aquilinae or booted eagle subfamily. This species is notable for the vivid colors and bold markings of adults, which differ considerably from the far more whitish plumage of the juvenile bird. The ornate hawk-eagle ranges from central Mexico south through much of Central America and in a somewhat spotty but broad overall range into South America, including in the west apart from the Andes and broadly on the Atlantic side especially Brazil down to as far as Southeast Brazil and northern Argentina. This species is found largely in primary forests with tall trees, although can be found in many forest types.

The ornate hawk-eagle female lays almost always a single egg and the species has a fairly prolonged breeding cycle like many tropical raptors, especially due to a lengthy post-fledging stage on which juveniles are dependent on their parents. It is a diversified and exceptionally powerful predator which takes a range of prey, usually various medium-to-large-sized birds and small-to-medium-sized mammals as well as occasional reptiles. Like many forest-dependent raptors, especially those in the tropical and subtropical regions, this species is likely under the pressing threat of deforestation. The decline of forest habitat in this species range, especially the Amazon rainforest, led the IUCN to uplist the ornate hawk-eagle as Near Threatened in 2016.

== Taxonomy ==
The ornate hawk-eagle is a member of the booted eagle subfamily, with the signature well-feathered tarsi present on both tropical and temperate species (and shared, presumably through convergent evolution, with a pair of buteonine hawks). It is one of four living members of the Spizaetus genus of "hawk-eagle" native to the neotropics. At one time, Old World hawk-eagles, native to various southern areas of Asia, were also included in the Spizaetus genus. However, genetic studies have shown the Asian group of species to be paraphyletic, resulting in the Old World members being placed in Nisaetus (Hodgson, 1836) and separated from the New World species.

The history of the American Spizaetus genus has been indicated by the diversity of hawk-eagles found in the fossil records in the United States and Mexico. At least five such species have been described, having presumably radiated from basal hawk-eagles of Asian origin across the Bering Land Bridge. Some of these are ancestors of modern Spizaetus species, with the genera having been present in North America at least since the Pliocene. Some forms were considerably more massive than any extant hawk-eagle and indeed were likely to have exceeded the size of any living booted eagle. Fossil species such as Spizaetus willetti may have grown to similar sizes as the modern harpy eagle (Harpia harpyja).

Genetic markers indicate the black-and-white hawk-eagle (Spizaetus melanoleucus) and especially the black-and-chestnut eagle (Spizaetus isidori) are closely related to the ornate hawk-eagle, resulting in their respective former genera of Spizastur and Oroaetus being eliminated. The fourth neotropical hawk-eagle, the black hawk-eagle (Spizaetus tyrannus), has been found to be basal to the other extant species. Per genetic research, the ornate hawk-eagle and black-and-chestnut eagle are considered as sister species.

The ornate hawk-eagle has two subspecies. The nominate subspecies (S. o. ornatus) occupies much of the South American range of the species, including eastern Colombia, Venezuela, and all of the species' range in Brazil and points south. The second subspecies, S. o. vicarius, has been described to inhabit the discontinuous northern part of the range, extending from Mexico and Central America south through much of western Colombia and western Ecuador and as far south as El Oro. The subspecies seem to differ mostly in the plumage characteristics of adults. Whereas the nominate birds are a more cinnamon-hued color on the neck with slightly paler ground color and sparser markings about the head and undersides, S. o. vicarius, tends to be darker overall, with a richer, deeper. more rufous color around the neck, denser and darker markings overall, and broader bands on the tail.

== Description ==
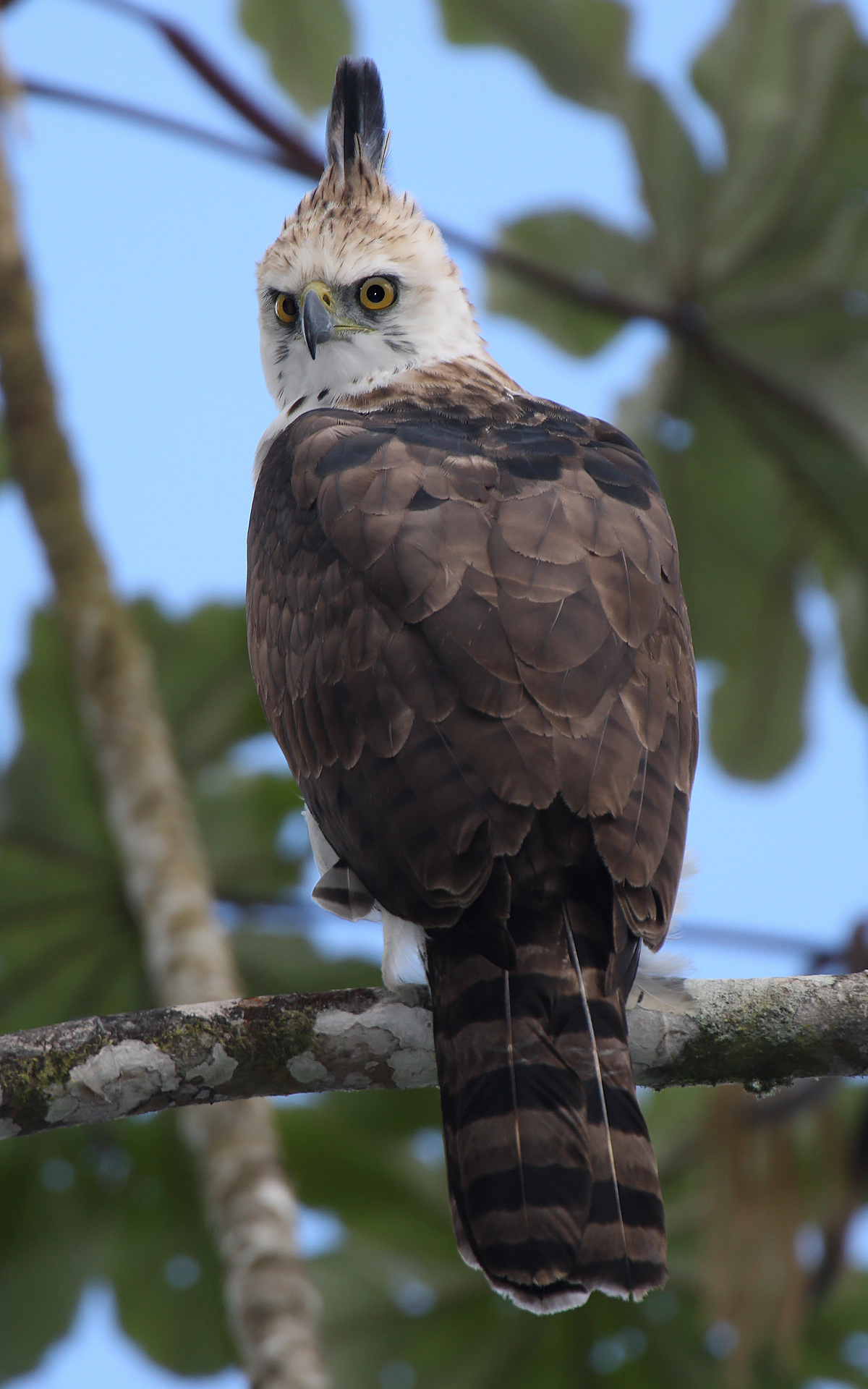
Immature, Darién National Park (Panama)

This is a medium to large-sized species of raptor, but small for an eagle. In the ornate hawk-eagle, the sexes are similar in appearance and overlap in size, but like most birds of prey, do show reverse sexual dimorphism, in which females outsize males to the contrary of most nonraptorial birds. The biggest female ornate hawk-eagles are 13% larger than the biggest males, with an average of about 8% greater in nominate race. In Central America, in extreme cases, the largest females are as much as 50% heavier than the smallest males. The species is slightly smaller than the largest members of widespread raptor genera such as the largest Buteo and Falco species, but is usually larger than other forest raptors in its range apart from vultures and other eagle species.

The total length of full-grown ornate hawk-eagle is 56.0 to 68.5 cm (22.0 to 27.0 in). Average total length is estimated at 60 cm (24 in) for males and 63 cm (25 in) for females. The wingspan may range from 117 to 142 cm (3 ft 10 in to 4 ft 8 in). Body mass can vary in males from 835 to 1,215 g (1.841 to 2.679 lb) and in females from 950 to 1,760 g (2.09 to 3.88 lb). The average weight of five adult males was 1,009 g (2.224 lb) while another five males averaged 1,035 g (2.282 lb). The average weight of four adult females was 1,421 g (3.133 lb), while a sample of 11 averaged 1,452 g (3.201 lb). Among standard measurements, wing chord measures from 312 to 360 mm (12.3 to 14.2 in) in males and 320 to 405 mm (12.6 to 15.9 in) in females against S. o. vicarius in which wing chord is known to measure 337.8 to 349.3 mm (13.30 to 13.75 in) in males and 353.3 to 388 mm (13.91 to 15.28 in) in females.

In tail length, males vary from 244 to 268 mm (9.6 to 10.6 in) and females from 266 to 290 mm (10.5 to 11.4 in). The culmen from cere measures 25.5 to 29 mm (1.00 to 1.14 in) in males and 27 to 31.5 mm (1.06 to 1.24 in). In tarsus length, males may measure 87 to 92 mm (3.4 to 3.6 in) and females may measure 89.5 to 100 mm (3.52 to 3.94 in). Average wing chord lengths from Guatemala (S. o. vicarius), showed seven males to average 339.8 mm (13.38 in) and eight females to average 377.8 mm (14.87 in). Meanwhile, in the same sample, mean tail length was 255.6 mm (10.06 in) in males and 281.6 mm (11.09 in) in females and mean tarsal length was 89 mm (3.5 in) and 94.1 mm (3.70 in) in the sexes, respectively. The largest rear talon (or hallux claw) present on all accipitrids (usually the main killing tool in these predators' arsenal) is particularly enlarged on the ornate hawk-eagle relative to its size, averaging about 36.7 mm (1.44 in) in males and 39.1 mm (1.54 in) in females from Guatemala, with an average foot span for both sexes measuring around 13.5 cm (5.3 in).

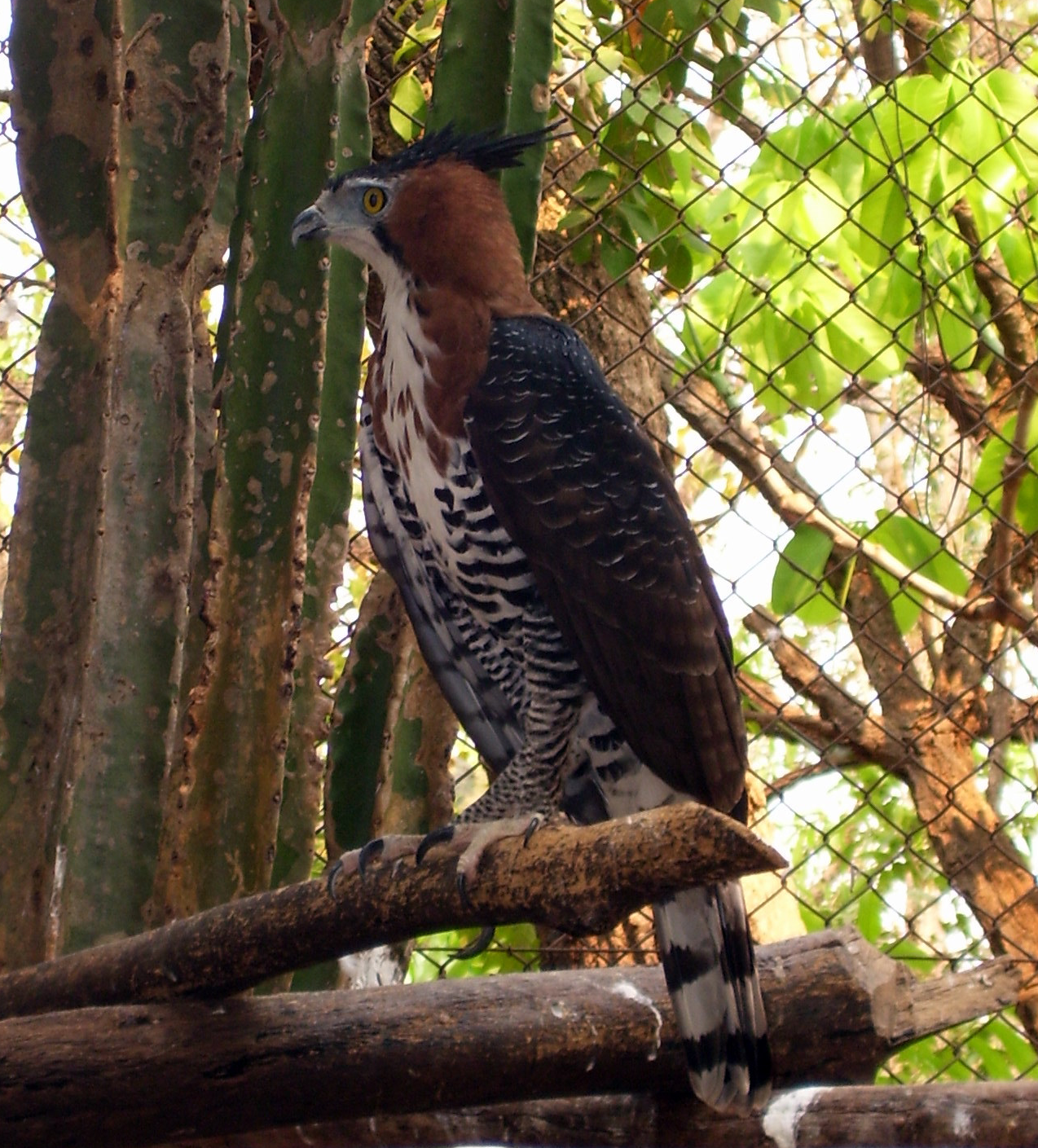
Adult, Federal University of Mato Grosso zoo, Cuiabá (Brazil)

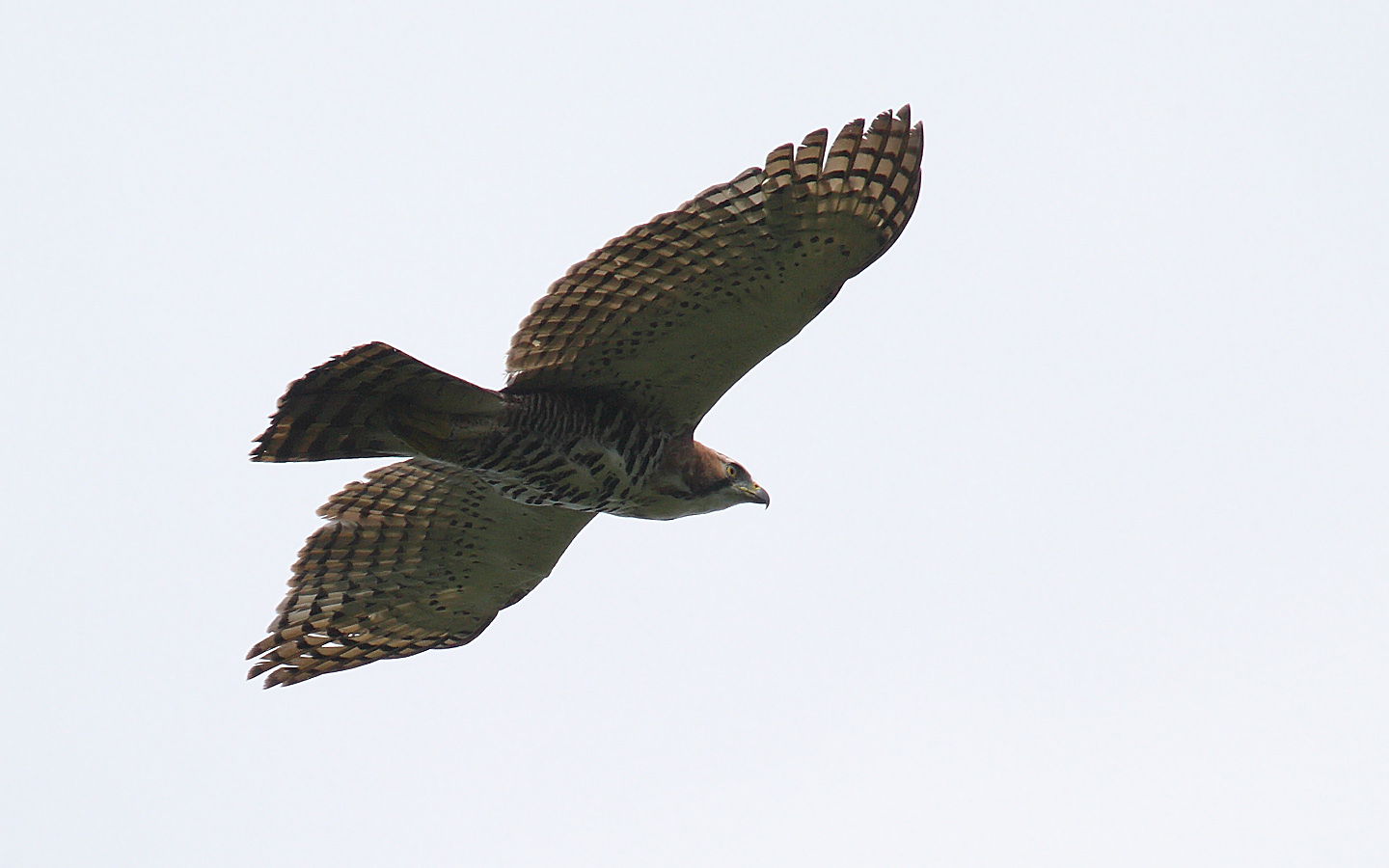
Adult in flight, Darién National Park (Panama)

Ornate hawk-eagles largely perch within the tree canopy, but sometimes are out on exposed branches, especially earlier in the morning. Usually soaring activity peaks in the late morning. Brown & Amadon (1986) described the species are "rather stolid and buteonine, despite the long tail and crest". Adults are largely distinguishable by their rufous cowls and bold barring below.

Furthermore, all ornate hawk-eagles bear a long, erectile crest, which may variously be laid flat against the head, protrude straight up like a spike, or sometimes hang at a slight curve. Adults when perched have an obvious black crown, crest, and malar stripes (continuing to sides as isolated streaks), set off by the rufous color on their cheeks, ear coverts, and sides of the neck and chest (sometimes completely covering their upper chests), the rufous shading into a somewhat browner rufous nape. On the upperside, they are barred blackish to dark brown with usually apparent white tips on the mantle and lesser wing coverts. Meanwhile, on the underside, they have a whitish base color, which other than the often-plain throat, is boldly overlaid with black barring, which extends down to the abdomen and legs, while the crissum is spotted black.

Like many forest raptors, the species has relatively short wings and a longish tail. When perched, their wing tips slightly exceed their tail base. The tail is blackish with a creamy whitish tip and three broad pale bands, which are greyish above and whitish below, the basal bar often being obscured. According to Brown & Amadon "the perched bird seemingly has legs set very far forward, almost under the chest, thus giving the impression of posed readiness. The position of the black crest hints at the bird's temper at the moment". Juvenile differ conspicuously in many respects, generally lacking most of the pigment visible in adults. Juveniles lack the adults' rufous collar, malar stripes and underside barring. Instead, the juvenile's whole head and underparts are white excepting thin black streaks on the crown and the tip of their crest.

Some juvenile ornate hawk-eagles do, however, show variable, light dark brown barring and spotting on the flanks and thighs, at even may manifest a vestigial moustache on the face. The juvenile's back and wings are dark brown with white-tipped blackish shoulders. The tail is somewhat similar to the adult's but has a broader white tip and at least 4-5 thinner bands, which like those of the adult are greyish above and whitish below. By their 2nd year, the young hawk-eagles enter an intermediate or subadult plumage that quickly starts to resemble that of the adults but is rather more faded in appearance. The subadult's face is a sandy to pale rufous color with an indistinct malar stripe, while the flanks, belly and legs increasingly start to manifest barring and spotting. The subadult's back is still largely dark brown but tends to appear increasingly blackish. Adults have orangish-yellow eyes, with a dull greenish to grey color on the cere and bare lores, while the feet are rich cream to pale yellow. Juveniles have white to whitish-yellow eyes, a yellow to bluish-grey cere and brighter yellow to orange feet. Apparently, the legs of juveniles are often less thickly feathered than those of adults.

In flight it may appear intermediate in size, being large relative to most forest raptors but rather small and slender-bodied for an eagle. The flying ornate hawk-eagle is prominent headed with short, broad rounded wings that show an emphasis on the bulging secondaries and pinch in at the bases of the trailing edges. Flight of the species is deep and powerful with the wings held flattish and pressed slightly forward, while the tail may be closed to slightly spread. From above, adult has a rufous cowl, a blackish mantle and a slightly brownish black back and wings with white-tipped shoulders and tail coverts. Below the underwing is paler looking relative to body with flecking or speckling only on the hand and thinly barred flight feathers. In flight, the juvenile ornate hawk-eagle is mainly dark brown above with whitish scaled blackish-brown shoulders. Below, the juvenile's wings have scattered spots on the axillaries and great wing-coverts, blackish tips to the white based outer primaries and thin barring on the other flight feathers, at times matching the patterning of the tail. By the second year, there is an only moderate increase to the flecks and spots on the wing linings, as the flight feathers and tail are the last to molt away from the juvenile-like look to those like adults.

=== Confusion species ===
While adult ornate hawk-eagles are obviously distinctly marked from most other raptors, one species strikingly resembles this bird, the juvenile of the gray-bellied hawk (Accipiter poliogaster) which is extremely different looking from the respective plumage of adult gray-bellieds. While not definitely proven, this is quite possibly a case of mimicry, as is known in other raptor assemblages wherein a less powerful species (the hawk) mimics a more powerful species (the hawk-eagle) presumably to mitigate potential predatory attacks. Distant gray-bellied hawks are best told apart by their very different proportions and build both in flight and perched. The gray-bellied hawks are typical of an Accipiter, having broader and much shorter wings, relatively more elongated tail and signature flap-flap-glide flight style.

Although the gray-bellied hawk is by a slight margin the largest member of that genus in South America, it is still considerably smaller than the hawk-eagle, averaging about a third smaller in length. At close range, it may noticeably differ, beyond the size discrepancy, by the hawk being crestless and bearing relatively long, featherless and yellow legs. Black hawk-eagles are fairly similarly shaped and similarly sized as the ornate hawk-eagle when seen in flight but are slightly larger in appearance, being longer tailed and longer winged. Nonetheless, the ornate hawk-eagle usually is slightly heavier on average than the black hawk-eagle and may appear chestier in perched birds than the more gracile black species. Confusion with the adult black hawk-eagle is unlikely given that it is always much darker, appear solidly soot colored apart from its heavily barred wings.

Juveniles and late first years stages of the black hawk-eagle are most likely to be confused in distant flight with perhaps a subadult ornate, however the juvenile black hawk-eagle is always much more heavily barred below with dark cheeks separating the white supericilia and throat. Haverschmidt (1968) mentioned a "dark morph" of the ornate hawk-eagle that he said was "nearly impossible" to distinguish from the black hawk-eagle but this is considered most likely to have been a misidentified black hawk-eagle in intermediate plumage. The juvenile ornate hawk-eagle is potentially confusable with the black-and-white hawk-eagle but the latter is smaller with boxier wings, shorter crest, a bold orange cere, a strong black mask and a blacker upper-body with white leading edges. Also the black-and-white bears no spots or barring on its wings and has a plain white underbody. The black-and-white species is more similar to an Accipiter in proportions than the ornate species, having relatively less expansive wings and somewhat more elongated looking tail. Juveniles are told from the similar juvenile black-and-chestnut eagle by their smaller size and by having more extensive spots and barring on the under wing (given the differences in altitudinal range, overlap in distribution is likely very minimal).

Juvenile hook-billed kite (Chondrohierax uncinatus) are also potentially confusable with juvenile ornates but the kite is much smaller and more dumpily built with more paddle-shaped wings, a squarer tail, with clearer bars on remiges and rectrices and bare tarsi. Another kite, the gray-headed kite (Leptodon cayanensis) can be considered similar in plumage in its adult plumage to the juvenile ornate but it is rather smaller with very different shape in all respects (especially in its small, pigeon-like head), completely different underwing pattern and unmarked body but for grey crown and nape. Pale juvenile crested eagles (Morphnus guianensis) appear much larger and longer tailed than juvenile ornate hawk-eagles with dark grey rather than dark brown backs, unbarred flanks and have a less marked hand in flight contrasting with more boldly barred primary quills. Despite the ornate species not infrequently being described as "slim", in actuality, the much bigger-looking crested eagle is much lighter for its size and only averages about 30% heavier than the ornate (other eagle species around the same total length as the crested eagle weigh about three times as much as the ornate species). Despite its somewhat similar plumage and appearance to the crested eagle, the harpy eagle is far more massive than the ornate hawk-eagle (nearly five times heavier on average) and unlikely to be confused with any plumage of the smaller species.

=== Vocalization ===
The main call known for the ornate hawk-eagle is a series of loud piping whistles. It is emitted by the soaring bird, usually male, and is often transcribed as whi whee-whee-wheep, the whee repeated anywhere from 2 to 9 times. Numerous variations are known are given in terms of transcription but most sources describe in roughly similar ways. Unlike the call of the black hawk-eagle, similarly done in flying display, the ornate hawk-eagle the introductory series of notes is more hurried and the last note more drawn out. It has been noted by some authors that the ornate species' call in nearly a reverse of the pattern of the calling black hawk-eagle which calls huwee-whee-whi-whi-wi-wi-wi, the first note being longest and slurred, second note highest, followed by descending short notes.

While perched, ornate hawk-eagle may let out a ca-lee-oo followed by an accelerating series of excited sounding laughing notes. Other reported call include a qu-ouw reminiscent of a limpkin (Aramus guarauna) call and a cat-like scream when disturbed. Perched juveniles have a food begging call consisting of a loud, clear whistle, which is repeatedly irregularly and transcribed aswheeu or wheee. While nesting, the male when arriving with food announces his presence with a pitpit call repeated four times. The most common form of call by the female is emitted during food begging, a hui note, which is usually repeated about four times. She may also call out a sharp fli-fli-fli-flio when being mobbed by small birds. A further call was once attributed to an ornate hawk-eagle that was hunting a guan was a very deep growl, reminiscent of a big cat, to such a degree that the witnesses initially thought the guan was being pursued by a jaguar (Panthera onca). However, further analysis has indicated that it was the guan itself that had let out the big catlike growl (possibly in an effort to startle the predator and perhaps successfully as the guan escaped) and not, in likelihood, the hawk-eagle itself.

== Range and habitat ==
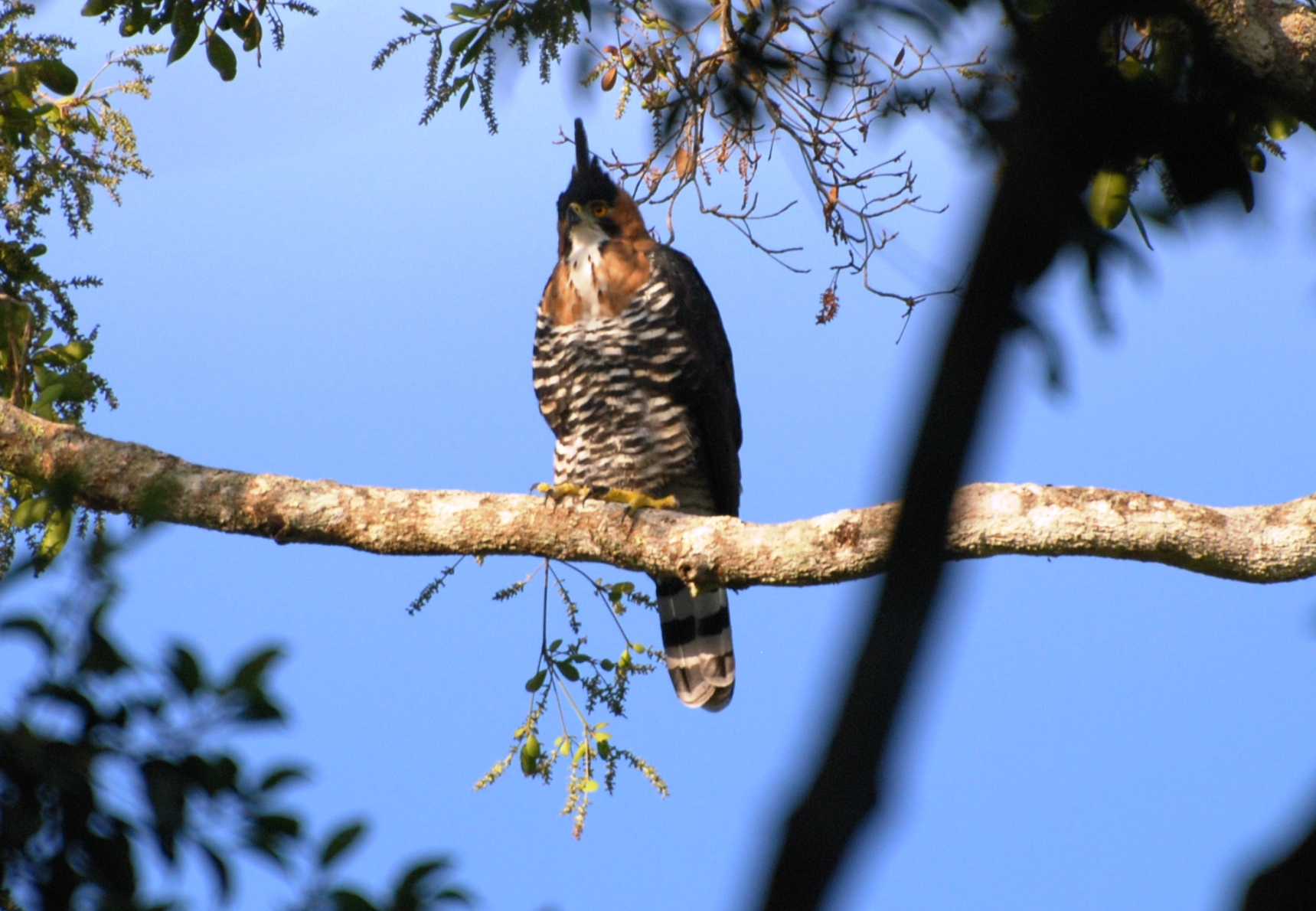
A wild adult in Campeche, Mexico showing characteristic preference for dense forest with tall trees

The ornate hawk-eagle has the largest distribution of the nine species of eagle endemic to the neotropics, ranging over an estimated 20.2 million square kilometers in total. This is a largely sedentary species, but some local dispersal is known to occur and individuals wander into drier forest and higher altitudes than normal. The species ranges as far north as southeastern Mexico, where it is found on the Caribbean slope from southern Tamaulipas, on Pacific more infrequently in Jalisco and east Oaxaca. In their Mexican range, their status is uncertain in Colima, where it may be extirpated.

Reportage of the species is known in the Mexican states of Guerrero and Nayarit but these could pertain to wandering individuals. Nesting remains unconfirmed throughout west Mexico and since most birds seen are juveniles, these could refer to post-dispersal wanderers. The species is found almost continuously through Central America in Belize, Guatemala, El Salvador, Honduras and Nicaragua into Costa Rica and Panama (including the isle of Coiba). In Panama, it is much more numerous on the more humid Caribbean side than the drier slopes of the Pacific, being especially scarce in the Panama Canal Zone and Azuero Peninsula, but can occur in more humid parts of the Pacific side.

A similar distributional favoring of the more humid Caribbean coast has been noted elsewhere in Central America as well. In South America, the range continues locally west of the Andes (formerly at least to tropical western Ecuador), being somewhat more commonly found north and east of the Andes in Colombia, northern and central Venezuela, Trinidad and Tobago, eastern Ecuador and the Guianas. In Brazil, it occupies nearly two-thirds of the large country south to Paraná and marginally into Santa Catarina and Rio Grande do Sul but is largely (if not entirely) absent from Mato Grosso do Sul, Minas Gerais and more or less the entirety of the northeast region. Their distribution continues through eastern Peru, northern, central and eastern Bolivia, southern Paraguay and northwestern (down to Tucumán) and northeastern Argentina (down to Santa Fe), though it has been wondered if the northeast occurrences are merely incidental wanderings of juveniles from adjacent populations. Despite its wide distribution, the species is frequently quite uncommon to increasingly rare in several parts of the range, though can outnumber other eagles (apart from the slightly more adaptable black hawk-eagle).

This species dwells in well forested regions, preferring tall, wet or humid, tropical and subtropical forests. Although some of the species can dwell in dry tropical forest this is usually quite secondary habitat. More so than black hawk-eagles, the ornate hawk-eagle tends to be found primarily only in unbroken primary forest tracts. Some records indicate that the ornate hawk-eagle may persist on tracts of forest down to only 200 ha (490 acres) but usually such extensive deforestation causes the species to vacate the area. The ornate hawk-eagle may be found at sea level to 1,500 m (4,900 ft), also rarely to about 1,800 m (5,900 ft). However, they've been recorded wandering to 3,000 m (9,800 ft) in Costa Rica. The species adapts quite well to cloud forest habitat, which are usually at higher elevations than typical rainforest habitats (i.e., in primary cloud forest of southern Mexico, the ornate hawk-eagle was one of the two most frequently recorded raptor species).

In some areas, the hawk-eagles may occasional habituate partially to edges, riversides and other openings, also into gallery strips and relatively short swamp forest. Deciduous forests, mixed pine-oak, taller stretches of secondary forests and shade coffee plantations, as long they have tall native tree canopies, may be visited and even locally nested in, as was recorded in Mexico. In Guatemala, they are often fairly distant from openings and dwell almost entirely in primary forest, especially areas where at least one very tall tree emerged above the average canopy level and there is less forest understory to more easily execute hunting. The Guatemalan hawk-eagles preferred fairly homogenous forest in drier upland parts of the humid forest, since the hilly areas of the forest tended to have more of the aforementioned habitat characteristic. However, the hawk-eagles here did sometimes occur in scrub-swamp forests as long as it retained tall trees, however the ornate hawk-eagles who nested in scrub-swamp forest type often went to the upland areas to hunt.

== Dietary habits ==
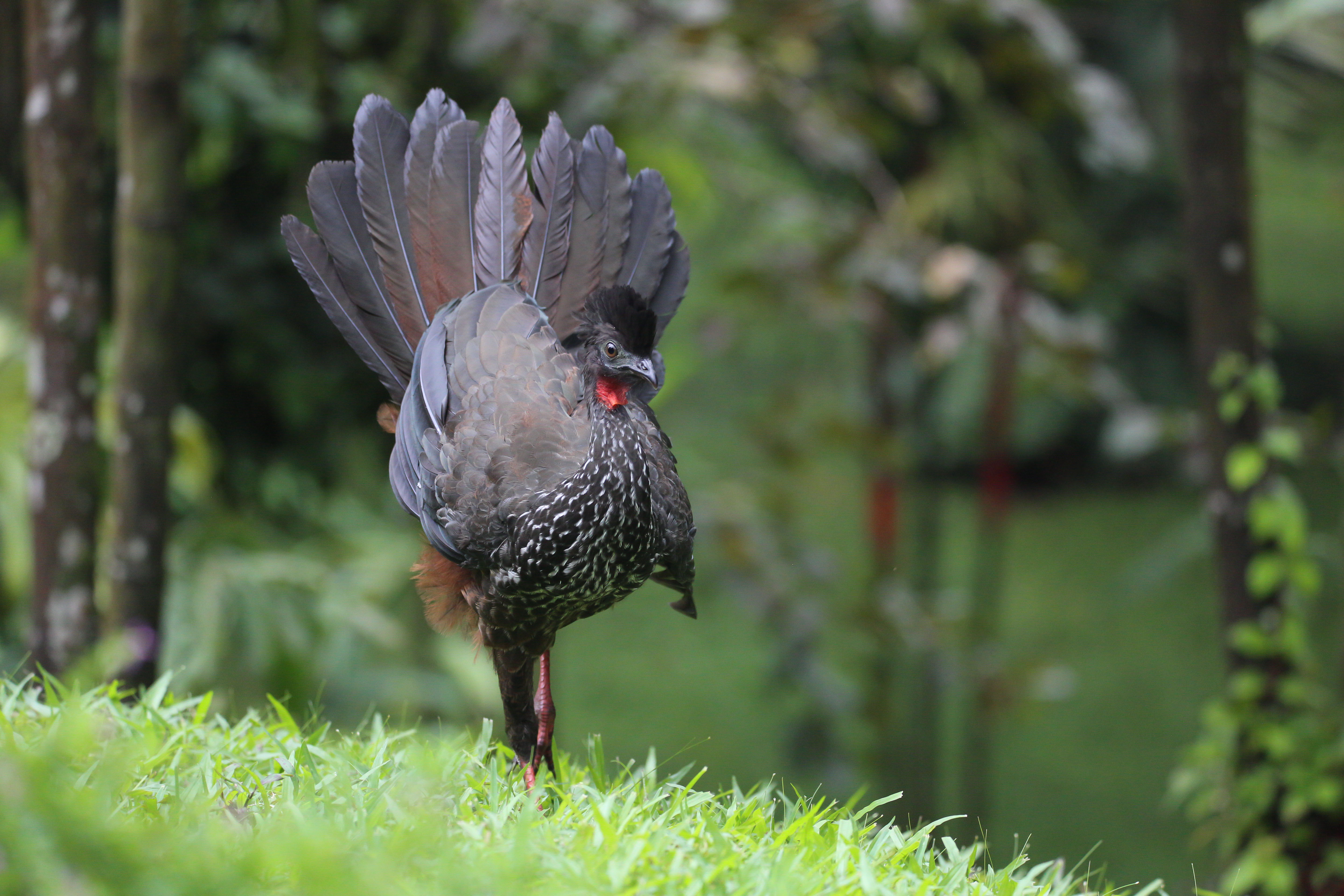
Largish forest birds, such as this crested guan, are often favored in the diet.

The ornate hawk-eagle is a powerful predator that readily varies its prey selection among two main prey groups. Largely the most significant prey for the species are medium to large sized birds. The other main prey type are a variety of small to medium-sized mammals. On occasion, reptiles may form a seldom part of the diet. This species largely forages inside forests, often perch-hunting. This entails short flights from tree to tree at mid-story heights while foraging or still-hunting from inconspicuous vantage points near the center of a dense canopy. Upon prey detection, they swoop to grasp the prey on the ground or in trees or engage in tail chases among trees. The agility imparted by its relative small and broad wings and longish tail and talent for tail-chases in enclosed woods and thickets are why this and similar eagles are referred to as "hawk-eagles", in reference to similar hunting styles in the "true hawks" (i.e., the members of the Accipiter and Astur genera).

In size, tail length and hunting style, the ornate hawk-eagle in particular is quite similar to the largest races of the larger Astur species (formerly Accipiter), the Eurasian goshawk (Astur gentilis). Most witnessed tail-chases by this species have involved chasing various gamebirds, with about equal accounts of successful and unsuccessful pursuits. In Guatemala, most attacks were launched when the hawk-eagle was 20 m (66 ft) from its quarry, with all successful attacks on prey on ground or low bushes and were from perches at 20 m (66 ft) high or lower in the trees. In Manú National Park, Peru, most observed attacks were untaken within about 50 m (160 ft) of the prey and prey was attacked mostly on the ground, although they also captured rails from shallow water (in one case losing a gallinule rail to a nearby caiman before the hawk-eagle could carry its prey away).

In attacking Guianan cock-of-the-rock (Rupicola rupicola) on their mating lek, 2 of 8 attempted attacks by ornate hawk-eagles were successful (and were the only successful attacks of 56 total attempts, the other 48 by different raptor species). The hawk-eagles made bold, fast dives into the middle of the leks, quickly grabbing a male cock-of-the-rock. Subsequently, one hawk-eagle consumed the bird right on the spot in one case and the other took its catch to a nearby perch. Reported instances of "power dives" into troops of monkeys and even heronries are probably similar in nature to the cock-of-the-rock attacks. In one case, an ornate hawk-eagle was able to capture a black vulture (Coragyps atratus) that had come to the carcass of a monkey that the hawk-eagle itself may have also killed. In general, a picture has emerged that the ornate hawk-eagle is a particularly opportunistic predator, attracted to conspicuous prey behaviors and less deeply searching in its foraging than most co-existing forest eagles.

In total, well over 100 prey species are known for ornate hawk-eagles. Of particularly broad import to ornate hawk-eagles are the cracid family of gamebirds such as chachalacas, guans and curassows. In fact, local names refer to this species at times as the "guan hawk" or the "curassow hawk". At least twelve species of cracid are taken quite often where available (including the crested guan [Penelope purpurascens]), and this is probably only a partial list of the species they hunt. However, the ornate hawk-eagle is far from specialized on cracid prey and takes more or less any medium-sized or larger avian prey they opportune upon. In total, about 65% of recorded prey species for ornate hawk-eagles are birds. Beyond cracids, some of the most significant prey families and orders are tinamou (at least 8 species), pigeons and doves (9 species or more), toucans (at least 7 species), parrots (at least 9 species) as well as assorted non-cracid gamebirds (such as New World quails) and largish passerines.

In Tikal, Guatemala, the most often identified avian prey on 10 ornate hawk-eagle territories was the keel-billed toucan (Ramphastos sulfuratus), accounting for 11.3% of 408 prey items, followed by the plain chachalaca (Ortalis vetula) (6.5%) and great tinamou (Tinamus major) (4%) (in by far the largest dietary study conducted for this hawk-eagle). In total, birds were 56.3% of the foods for the species at the Tikal study. Another Guatemalan study observed 6 avian prey items and 1 mammal (bat) as prey as a hawk-eagle nest. The next largest known study, in rainforests near Manaus, Brazil, found among 82 prey items, birds made up 63.3% of the diet. The most often identified avian prey here were probable dusky-legged guan (Penelope obscura) (20.4%) and two species of large tinamous (12.24%).

At a slightly smaller dietary study of the southern part of the Atlantic forest of Brazil found that 90% of 30 prey items were birds, principally brown tinamou (Crypturellus obsoletus) (33.3%), Leptotila doves (10%), dusky-legged guan and green-barred woodpecker (Colaptes melanochloros) (both 6.67%). Apparently, birds (including chickens (Gallus gallus domesticus)) were the main foods in Trinidad and Tobago. In a nest in Rio Grande do Sul, Brazil, 14 of 15 prey items were assorted birds. More secondary avian prey recorded for ornate hawk-eagles includes cuckoos, potoos, rails, trumpeters, herons and egrets, vultures, owls, kingfishers, motmots and hoatzins (Opisthocomus hoazin).

However, at both Tikal and Manaus, the most often identified prey species types were mammals. In Tikal, the similar Yucatan squirrel (Sciurus yucatanensis) and the Deppe's squirrel (Sciurus deppei) lead the food by number, accounting for 28.2% of the foods. In Manu, unidentified species of large terrestrial rodents, either agoutis or the similar but smaller acouchis took the primary position, making up 24.4% of the diet. At a single nest in Henri Pittier National Park, Venezuela, without presented metrics, rodents and mammals were observed to outnumber birds in the diet, namely the red-tailed squirrel (Sciurus granatensis) and cotton rats (Sigmodon ssp.). Among mammals, these medium to fairly large rodents regardless of whether they show terrestrial (agoutis and similar species) or arboreal (tree squirrels) tendencies make up the largest known portion of the food, perhaps most key being partially diurnal habits.

Another widely recorded mammalian prey group are procyonids despite a slight penchant for more nocturnal activity, including such prey as raccoon (Procyon lotor), white-nosed coati (Nasua narica), kinkajou (Poto flavus) and cacomistle (Bassariscus sumichrasti). Usually the hawk-eagles are likely to target juveniles of the larger species of procyonid, although adults at least up to the size of kinkajous may be taken. However, certainly the most well-studied mammalian prey for ornate hawk-eagles are New World monkeys, which they do not hunt necessarily seem to hunt preferentially. However, they are unlikely to ignore an opportunity to prey upon primates. Among monkeys, mainly those of a smaller size class are hunted, largely such groups as squirrel monkeys, tamarins, marmosets and titi monkeys are attacked. In most such monkey species, adults usually weigh less than 1.5 kg (3.3 lb), and juveniles may be slightly more regularly taken even for species this small.

Larger primates, those averaging over 2 kg (4.4 lb), are on occasion vulnerable to predation by ornate hawk-eagles including white-faced sakis (Pithecia pithecia), Guatemalan black howler (Alouatta pigra) (certainly only juveniles of this very large howler monkey) and some species of capuchin monkey. Due to the range of predators that they attract given their relatively smaller size, monkeys in the neotropics are highly wary and have well-developed anti-predator defenses, especially a variety of alarm calls, grouping techniques, great arboreal agility and aggressive defensive attacks by top males, all of which make monkeys more difficult to attack than more solitary, terrestrial and/or slower-moving mammal prey of similar size. Relatively few mammalian prey are taken outside of rodents, procyonids and monkeys, but ornate hawk-eagles are also known to take Jamaican fruit bats (Artibeus jamaicensis), other leaf-nosed bats, a few species of opossum, silky anteaters (Cyclopes didactylus) and even apparently bush dogs (Speothos venaticus). One reported instance of scavenging on carrion has been reported for this hawk-eagle, on the carcass of a domestic cow (Bos primigenius taurus). Apart from mammals and birds, only rarely does the ornate hawk-eagle seem to hunt reptiles (i.e., lizards and unidentified snakes). While in many dietary studies no reptiles were known to be taken, in the Manaus area of Brazil reptiles made up nearly 4.1% of the diet.

The size of prey taken can be quite variable for ornate hawk-eagles. In one estimate, most prey (specifically avian types) was estimated to weigh between 160 and 3,800 g (0.35 and 8.38 lb). In the large study of Tikal, Guatemala, the size of prey items was estimated to weigh from 50 g (1.8 oz) for the Jamaican fruit bat to 4.1 kg (9.0 lb) for the great curassow (Crax rubra). Another prey item taken of similar size to the fruit bat is the Mexican mouse opossum (Marmosa mexicana) and these two species are the smallest known mammalian prey for ornate hawk-eagle. The smallest avian prey recorded thus far is the 36.3 g (1.28 oz) long-tailed silky-flycatcher (Ptilogonys caudatus). Otherwise, passerine prey taken are slightly larger, usually various jays and icterids, resulting in persistent mobbing of hawk-eagles by species such as brown jays (Psilorhinus morio) (this loud mobbing of the hawk-eagles in Central America in turn allows researchers to more easily find the raptors).

Despite the ornate hawk-eagles' notable predatory power and ability to take large prey, mean prey sizes taken in a couple of estimates are not exceptional relative to their own body mass, though are perhaps slightly higher than those for most similarly sized raptors. In the Tikal study, mean prey size was estimated at 517 g (1.140 lb), with avian prey averaging an estimated 695 g (1.532 lb) and mammal prey (which consisted largely of squirrels) averaging an estimated 388 g (13.7 oz). In the smaller dietary study from the Atlantic forests of Brazil, estimated mean prey size was 417 g (14.7 oz). Thus mean prey sizes from the two studies averages at about 34-42% of the hawk-eagle's own body size. Within their enclosed forest habitats, ornate hawk-eagle are capable of attacking much of the largest avian prey available, excepting larger birds of prey (the largest regional water birds such as storks rarely enter deep forest habitat). This species is capable of tackling healthy prey weighing up to at least four times its own weight.

These include the aforementioned great curassow and the ocellated turkey (Meleagris ocellata), of which the ornate hawk-eagle is capable of taking adults weighing 5 kg (11 lb) or more. Mammalian prey taken can reach an estimated 3.8 kg (8.4 lb) in the case of a Central American agouti (Dasyprocta punctata). Other mammalian prey including the largest procyonids and monkeys hunted by the hawk-eagle can reach similar body masses, i.e., approximately 4 kg (8.8 lb) and perhaps even up to around 6 kg (13 lb). Of a similar size range to these largest birds and mammals, numerous successful attacks have reported on adults of the green iguana (Iguana iguana), which weigh an average of about 4 kg (8.8 lb). When capturing such large prey, ornate hawk-eagles are incapable of flying with them. In the case of agoutis and curassows killed in Tikal, the hawk-eagles would return repeatedly to feed on their kill, ultimately consuming about half of the bodies before decomposition sets in. A male ornate hawk-eagle that had killed a great tinamou of roughly equal weight to itself (both around 1,050 g (2.31 lb)) was similarly grounded after being unable to fly with its kill (only consuming the head before being flushed by researchers).

=== Interspecies relations ===
The ornate hawk-eagle overlaps in distribution with many raptors, including other powerful eagles. Furthermore, there appears to be considerable habitat selection overlap between these species, including both black-and-white hawk-eagle and black hawk-eagle, although the latter is somewhat more adaptable to openings and forest fragmentation. Furthermore, the larger species such as the crested and harpy eagle are largely concurrent in distribution and habitat with the ornate hawk-eagle. While interspecies relations of neotropical eagles are relatively poorly known, it is likely that there is some degree of natural partitioning to allow the raptors to co-exist. To the best knowledge of ornithologists and other researchers, the most likely form of partitioning comes in the form of the dietary preferences. While the three lowland hawk-eagles select broadly similar prey species across their prey spectrum, each focuses primarily on a different prey group.

While the largest dietary study from Tikal, Guatemala showed that ornate hawk-eagle somewhat prefers relatively larger class birds, such as cracids, tinamous and toucans, alternately with smallish, primarily diurnal mammals, adjacent studies in Tikal of the black hawk-eagles shows they primarily hunted small, nocturnal mammals such as bats and mouse opossums. Other (but not all) studies also indicate a preference for mammals of varying sizes (perhaps to the size of raccoons) in the diet of black hawk-eagles. Meanwhile, black-and-white hawk-eagles have been indicated to show a preference for slightly smaller birds than those selected by ornate hawk-eagles, such as medium-to-large passerines, pigeons and smallish toucans (such as aracaris and toucanets), though capable of preying on adult ducks and even monkeys quite as large as those taken by the ornate. The most similar hawk-eagle by diet is the closely related black-and-chestnut eagle, as this often hunts gamebirds such as cracids and procyonids like the ornate, but this species has a different altitudinal range being found in forests in the high montane forests, usually at a minimum elevation of 1,800 m (5,900 ft).

Other eagle-like forest raptors such as solitary eagles (Buteogallus solitarius), whose mountainous range (similar to the black-and-chestnut) barely abuts the altitudinal range with ornate hawk-eagle, have strongly different dietary preferences (e.g., snakes) while other Buteogallus species tend to be much more aquatically based both in diet and habitat preferences. Overlap in the prey spectrum is known with both crested and harpy eagles, but dietary preferences differ considerably. In the harpy eagle, preferred prey are sloths (which have never been known to fall prey to ornate hawk-eagles) and larger sized New World monkeys. Meanwhile, the crested eagle seems to prefer intermediately sized mammals, including monkeys mostly between tamarin and capuchin monkey-sized, but to also seemingly take prey of more varied classes than other lowland forest eagles.

In Tikal, like the black hawk-eagle, the crested eagle appears to prefer nocturnal mammals, mostly various opossums, and presumably has a more intensive searching method of hunting rather than the opportunistic hunting typical of the ornate species. In terms of predation on monkeys, a guild of avian predators and a corresponding forest wild cat appear rather neatly partitioned by the size of monkeys being hunted: Spizaetus eagles as well as other relatively small but powerful raptors and margays (Leopardus wiedii) select the smaller size monkey species, crested eagles and ocelots (Leopardus pardalis) mainly hunt the medium-sized monkeys and harpy eagles and jaguars focus most exclusively on larger sized monkeys.

The various forest eagles of the neotropics appear to be surprisingly tolerant of other species, with almost no aggressive interspecies interactions known in the literature. Mostly only vultures seem to provoke a slight aggressive reaction from the parents in nesting ornate hawk-eagles (possibly because some studies indicate that forest-foraging vultures are more commonly egg thieves than those found in more open habitats). Although, in one Guatemalan study the presence of flying black hawk-eagles and swallow-tailed kites (Elanoides forficatus) (which are unlikely to prey on nests) also provoked a defensive whistle by the brooding female ornate hawk-eagle. Indicating a lack of interspecies aggression, one active harpy eagle nest was set with a camera trap captured photographs of a pair of ornate hawk-eagles in a breeding display in the immediate vicinity of the nest, with both species apparently indifferent to each other's presence.

== Breeding ==
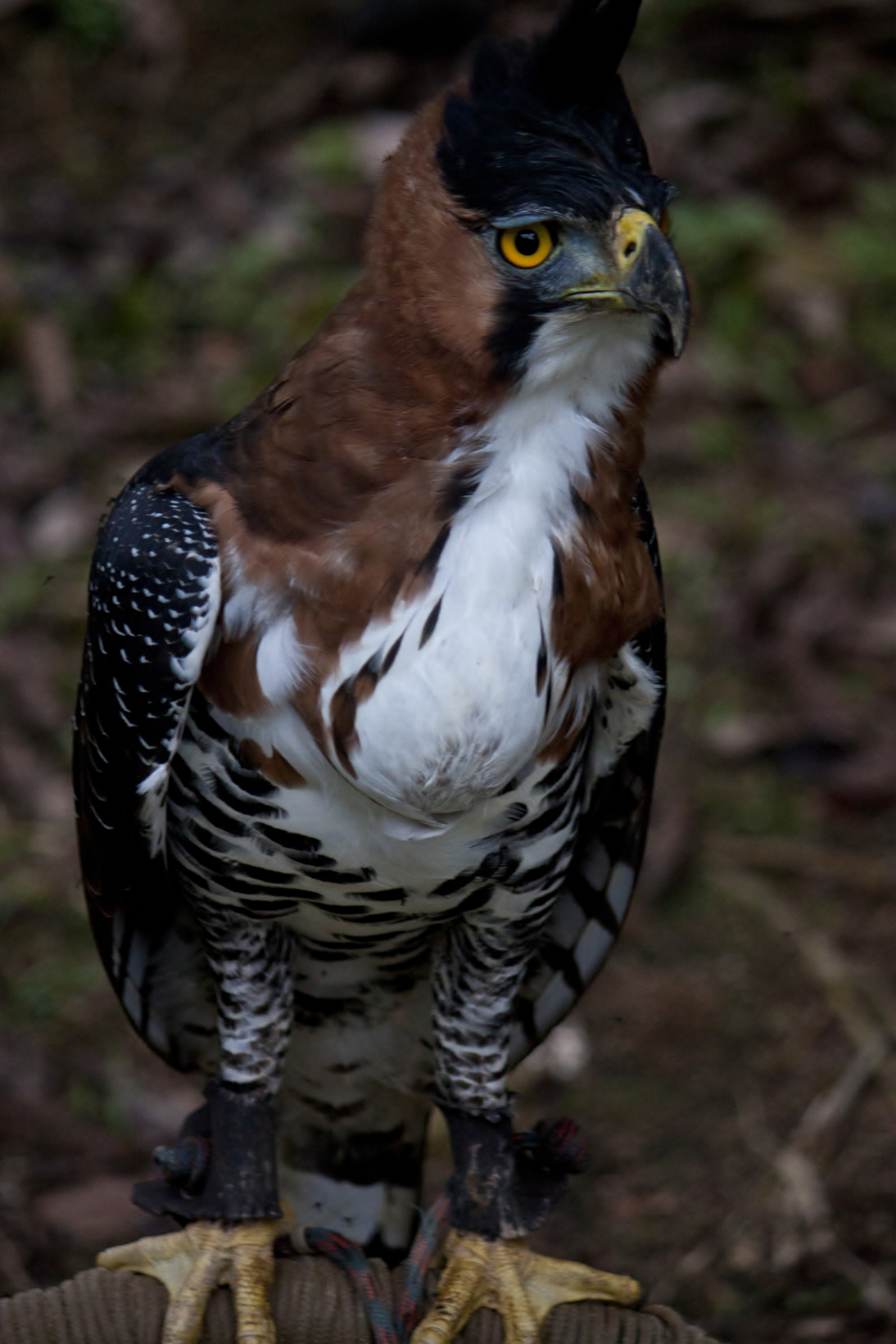
A captive adult, photographed near the Loreto Region, Peru

Ornate hawk-eagles, like most but not all raptors, live solitarily or in pairs. Breeding territories are maintained through high circling, either by a solo adult or by a pair. Most displays occur in mid to late morning and are usually at fairly low heights with occasional calling. Sometimes one bird breaks into butterfly-like flight with shallow flutters during display. Other noisy acrobatics are engaged by the male while the female perches, some of which are correlated with courtship. In a mutual display, the pair gliding in tight circles, the male approaching the female from above and behind, as the female rolls to her back and they engage in talon grabbing, occasionally touching. The aerial display of the ornate hawk-eagle can escalate into roller coaster sky-dance involving series of 10 m (33 ft) dives at about 45 degrees on half-closed wings interspersed with heavy looking climbs and floppy beats with looping gyrations and occasionally a complete loop.

Home range size is variable in different seasons, from 0.6 to 2 km^{2} (0.23 to 0.77 sq mi) and estimated density can vary from one 1 bird per 0.8 km^{2} (0.31 sq mi) to 13 birds per 10 km^{2} (3.9 sq mi) in parts of Guatemala and French Guiana, respectively. In Tikal, Guatemala, adult birds of both sexes used an average of 10 to 14 km^{2} (3.9 to 5.4 sq mi), occasionally ranging up to at least 19.5 km^{2} (7.5 sq mi). Here the mean nearest nest distance was estimated at 2.96 km (1.84 mi). In the much sparser population of the Atlantic Forest of Brazil, it was estimated that there was one pair per each 53.75 km (33.40 mi). In the Petén area of Guatemala there is an estimated nesting density of one pair per 787 ha (1,940 acres). The Tikal studies shows evidence of pairs shifting their territorial boundaries, in some cases this has been apparently and surprisingly due to the intrusion of another ornate hawk-eagle. Per the study: "Perhaps in these formidably armed bird predators, territory occupants sometimes readjust their patterns of spatial use rather risk outright aggressive contest".

Ornate hawk-eagles can typically only breed every other year, unless a prior year's nesting attempt fails. Breeding cycles are known to be more prolonged in tropic raptors than in those that dwell in temperate zones. Also tropical species usually have smaller brood sizes. The dichotomy in breeding habits is often most extreme in forest-dwelling tropical raptor species, which in large species tend to have an extremely prolonged post-fledging care stage for young raptors. The breeding season of ornate hawk-eagles normally falls between December and September in Central America, while it is largely in August–January in Brazil. Courtship and nesting behavior were seen in Panama during August to October (later in the year than nearby black hawk-eagles, implying a temporal difference in nesting times for the two species). In Trinidad and Tobago, nest building is around November while in Venezuela was reportedly in March. This species seemingly lays its clutches in the dry season and fledges in the early wet season. In Tikal, Guatemala, the mean egg laying time was mid-March, while in Belize it was similar but slightly earlier in March. In the extensive studies from Tikal, eggs were laid variously anytime from November to May, but 83% were between January and April. Meanwhile, in the Manaus area of Brazil egg laying peaks in August, although copulation has been witnessed as long before then as June, which may imply a particularly prolonged courtship stage. Copulation typically lasts for 6–12 seconds with 60 copulations recorded in 204 hours of observation.

=== Nests ===
This species builds a bulky, large stick nest that is generally typical of an accipitrid. Nests are exclusively located in trees. The nest height is often 20 to 30 m (66 to 98 ft) above the ground. Two nests in Guatemala were about 20 m (66 ft) both in trees of a total height of around 30 m (98 ft) while, in Belize, the nest height of 3 were from 17.7 to 21.9 m (58 to 72 ft) in trees of a total height of 27.4 to 34.8 m (90 to 114 ft). In Tikal, 14 nests were found to be at anywhere from 16 to 30 m (52 to 98 ft) above the ground with an average of 22.9 m (75 ft) and an average total nesting tree height of 30 m (98 ft). Nest heights in the Atlantic Forest, Brazil were between 17.7 and 38.5 m (58 and 126 ft). Tree species are often variable, the most significant factor in the seeming selection of nesting trees is that it is often the tallest tree in the forest stand, emerging above the average canopy height.

In Tikal, six nests were in Honduran mahogany (Swietenia macrophylla), four were in kapok or ceiba trees (Ceiba pentandra), two in invasive black olive (Olea europaea) and single nests in various genera such as Ficus, Piscidia, Cedrela, Pouteria and Calophyllum. Further studies show that ceiba trees are popular elsewhere in the northern part of the range. Nests are placed in relatively exposed branches, often being on the main crutch of the tree or the largest, most bare branch (in comparison, black hawk-eagle nests are more difficult to find since they are typically inside the denser foliage of the canopy). Typical sized nests are about 1 to 1.25 m (3 ft 3 in to 4 ft 1 in) across and about 50 cm (20 in) deep. 16 nests in Tikal averaged 1.02 m (3 ft 4 in) in diameter and 49 cm (19 in) in outer depth. In the Manaus area of Brazil, a single nest was a relatively large 1.7 m (5 ft 7 in) in diameter. In Henri Pittier National Park, Venezuela one nest was observed to be 1.09 m (3 ft 7 in) diameter by 92 cm (36 in) deep. One record sized nest in terms of depth apparently reached 1.5 m (4 ft 11 in) deep and included sticks of up to 10 cm (3.9 in) diameter.

=== Eggs ===
Ornate hawk-eagles typically lay only a single egg. All nests of the species in the wild are known to contain only a single egg. Single egg clutches are also laid by other Spizaetus hawk-eagles. However, in captivity, at least one female has been known to lay a two egg clutch. The eggs are mainly white in color sparingly overlaid with brownish or brown-red splotches. In texture, the eggs are not glossy and are somewhat pitted to the touch. In Tikal, the eggs averaged (in a sample of four) 60.22 mm × 45.37 mm (2.371 in × 1.786 in) and weighed typically about 75.5 g (2.66 oz). The two egg clutch recorded in captivity differed in many respects from those of wild Guatemalan hawk-eagles. They were smaller, the first measuring 57.71 mm × 44.18 mm (2.272 in × 1.739 in) and weighing 60.24 g (2.125 oz), the second measuring 58.17 mm × 43.37 mm (2.290 in × 1.707 in) and weighing 58.5 g (2.06 oz). Additionally, instead of being whitish with faint brown or reddish spotting, they were unspotted and bluish-white in color.

=== Parental behavior ===
Prior to egg-laying, the female may remain in the area of the nest 97.2% of the time while the male was in the vicinity only 30.4% of the time in Tikal. Both prior to egg laying and during incubation, the female of the pair often collects green leaves to line the nest bowl, doing so nearly every day both in Guatemala and the Manaus area of Brazil. The female takes a lion's share of the incubation duties. For example, records from Guatemala and Belize show she incubates about 95-97% of observed hours. In 127 hours in Guatemala, she left her egg unattended only for a period of 9 minutes. Incubation lasted for 43 to 48 days in Tikal while in Belize incubation was for 44 to 46 days.

As in most accipitrids, males usually capture prey and bring it to the female throughout incubation. When delivering prey, the male and female may call back and forth for several minutes before exchanging the prey item. Furthermore, in Guatemala, the male would relieve the female for any amount of time from 9 minutes to 68 minutes while the female fed, in Brazil he never approached the nest but in one case attempted to and was aggressively displaced by his larger mate. Prey deliveries are done foot-to-foot, and in Tikal the females would immediately behead each mammal or remove the beak from each bird prey item brought to her. During both incubation and subsequent to hatching, both parents may defend their offspring from potential predators, but especially the female. Vultures seem to provoke an aggressive response in different parts of the range, consisting of the female raising her crest, mantling over her egg and calling loudly. Egg-eating mammals seem to provoke a more active anti-predator defense.

In Brazil, red-faced spider monkeys (Ateles paniscus) were seen to be attacked and swooped upon by the female, but in a second encounter during which the monkey troop returned, she remained on the nest. Similar anti-predator behavior was observed in Guatemala, where Geoffroy's spider monkeys (Ateles geoffroyi) were flown at and struck until they left the vicinity. In another Guatemalan encounter, a tayra (Eira barbara), a large arboreal mustelid, was observed to be scaling a nest tree and was knocked out of the tree by the female hawk-eagle twice, fleeing after the second time this occurred. Studies from Guatemala show that humans also draw the ire of the female ornate hawk-eagle. It was found that while climbing to a tree blind near the nest tree that females regularly struck researchers, often causing lacerations even with protective gear on, and were rated as considerably more aggressive in nest defense than black hawk-eagles and crested eagles. In Oaxaca, Mexico, a researcher was struck instead by the male of an ornate hawk-eagle pair. In the Manaus, perhaps because of a larger regional human population causing more shyness or desensitization to human activities, female ornate hawk-eagles were less aggressive to humans in the nest vicinity and did not respond even to workers using chainsaws within 38 m (125 ft) of the nest.

=== Nesting development ===
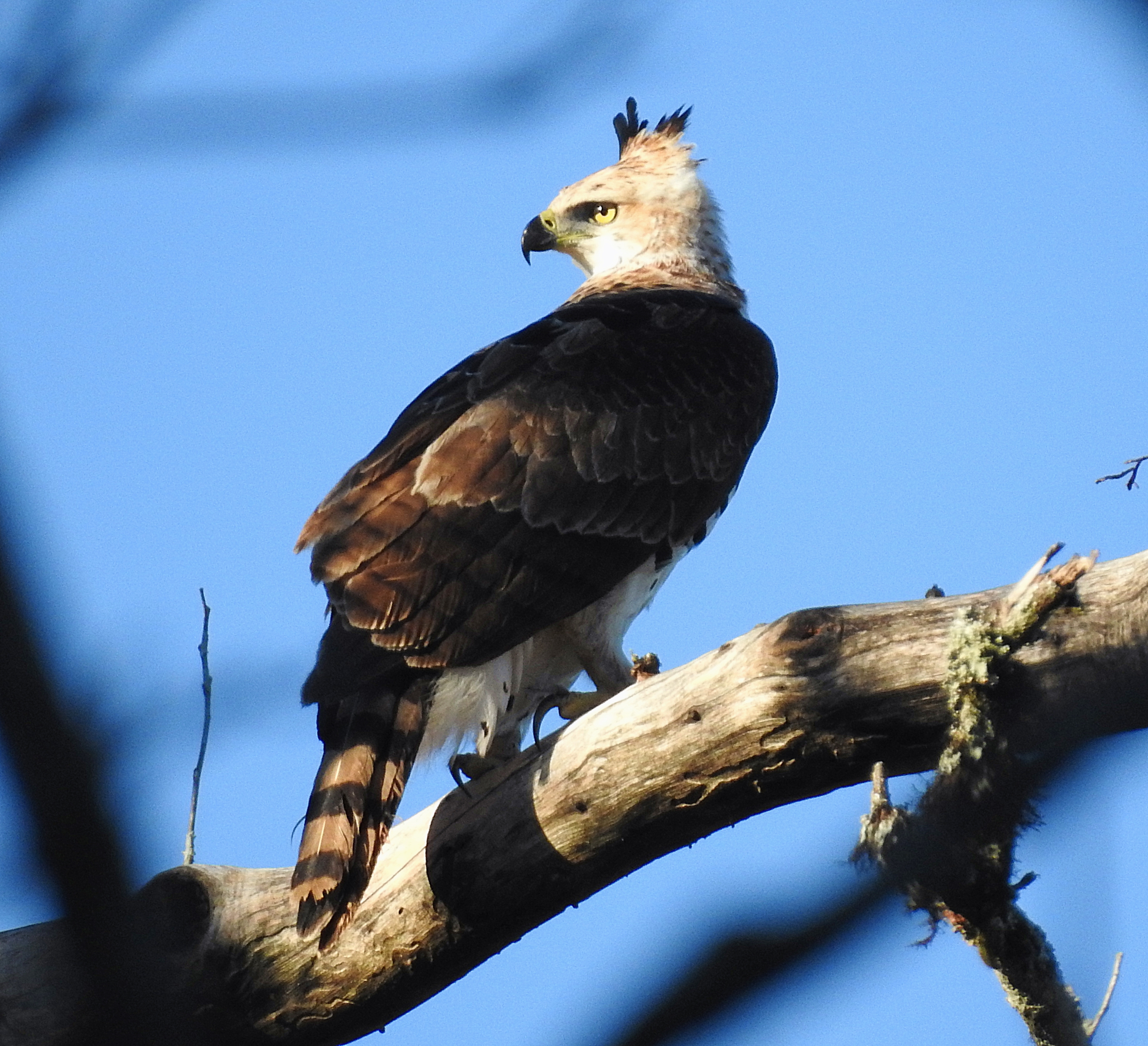
A young ornate hawk-eagle in the wild

The hatching date in this species is, of course, dependent on when the eggs are laid. Studies from the Tikal area showed 90% of hatching occurred between February and June, peaking between late April and early May. It is likely that the hatching period here is timed with the peak time for fledging of other bird species for easy prey capture. Hatching was observed at a single nest in Trinidad and Tobago in March. In Manaus, Brazil, hatching occurred in September. In Venezuela, the hatchling eagle was found to measure 15.2 cm (6.0 in) in length and weigh 150 g (5.3 oz). The studies from Tikal and Manaus describe details of the nestling development over time. Like most birds, and especially birds of prey, the hatchlings are initially altricial. In this species, the eaglets are still unable to lift their heads at 2–4 days old. By about two weeks of age, the young eaglet can start to stand on its folded leg within the nest. The begging calls will increase at about 3 weeks of age.

A case in Guatemala of a 16-day-old nestling trying to feed itself and defecate over the nest edge is considered rather early for both behaviors. At 36 days, the young hawk-eagle may begin to peck at carcasses but at 49 days cannot still effectively fed itself, with the first food tearing and eating recorded at between 52 and 54 days of age. At 39 days, the feathers of the wing and the tail begin to overtake the down. By the 8th week, the eaglet should be able to stand, wing flap and play with sticks within the nest. A week later, the young tend to be markedly more independent, largely feeding themselves on the carcasses their parents provide and ranging out of the nest for the first time on branches up to 6 m (20 ft) from their nest, often flapping their wings a considerable amount. Fledging may occur at any age from 60 to 93 days. The average age at fledgling was estimated as 77.5 days in Tikal while in Belize it was similarly in the range of 70 to 84 days. At 12 weeks, the full juvenile plumage is attained. Despite the full plumage and powers of flight, the juvenile hawk-eagles continue to linger in the vicinity of the nest, typically venturing no further than 100 to 170 m (330 to 560 ft) from the nest for months. The young eagles often continue to beg loudly for food, especially once their parents are in view, but if their crop is full they often retire to quietly sit in dense foliage. In one case from Brazil, the juvenile eagle was observed to fly up to greet one of its parents and grabbed the prey item without landing before continuing to a nearby perch.

In Guatemala, three young males were still in 50 to 100 m (160 to 330 ft) away from the nest at 5 months of age. In the same area, two females of 9 months age were typically 100 to 200 m (330 to 660 ft) away from the nest while another two young females of the same age were at an average distance from the nest of 500 m (1,600 ft). At 11–12 months, the juveniles may begin to soar around their parents' territory. 3 females in Tikal gradually increase their wanderings at 12–14 months old, ranging anywhere from 900 m (3,000 ft) to 3 km (1.9 mi) from the nest. Around a year of age, the juvenile eagles are likely to make their first attempts to hunt prey. The minimum age at which independence appears to be possible for ornate hawk-eagles is around 11.5–12 months. The average age of independence in studies from Tikal was found to 15.4 months of age for 13 banded juveniles. More poorly known is the age of maturity, which has been estimated at only two years, a matter of months after independence and when the hawk-eagles appear to enter their subadult plumage stage. There is little inconvertible evidence that the species begins breeding at any younger than three years of age.

At least one case in Tikal was observed of a pair both in subadult plumage that was breeding, however. While breeding success rates are not known for this species this same subadult breeding pair was observed to kill and cannibalize a juvenile from another territory. When a nest was in imminent risk of flooding from the overflow of a nearby reservoir in southern Brazil, a pair of ornate hawk-eagles appeared to accept translocation when researchers relocated an entire nest intact with nestling in tow to nearby tree, at 380 m (1,250 ft) away. In interspecies comparisons, Tikal studies showed that black hawk-eagles are independent slightly faster at around 12 months old but, like the ornate, also reach maturity roughly in the zone of 2 to 3 years of age while crested eagles take 22.7–30 months until independence and start breeding somewhere around 3 to 4 years of age. In many of the larger eagles, including the harpy eagle, whether tropical or temperate zone dwelling, the minimum age of maturity seems to be around 5 years of age and in some large Afro-tropical species, possibly ranges up to more than 7 years of age.

== Status ==
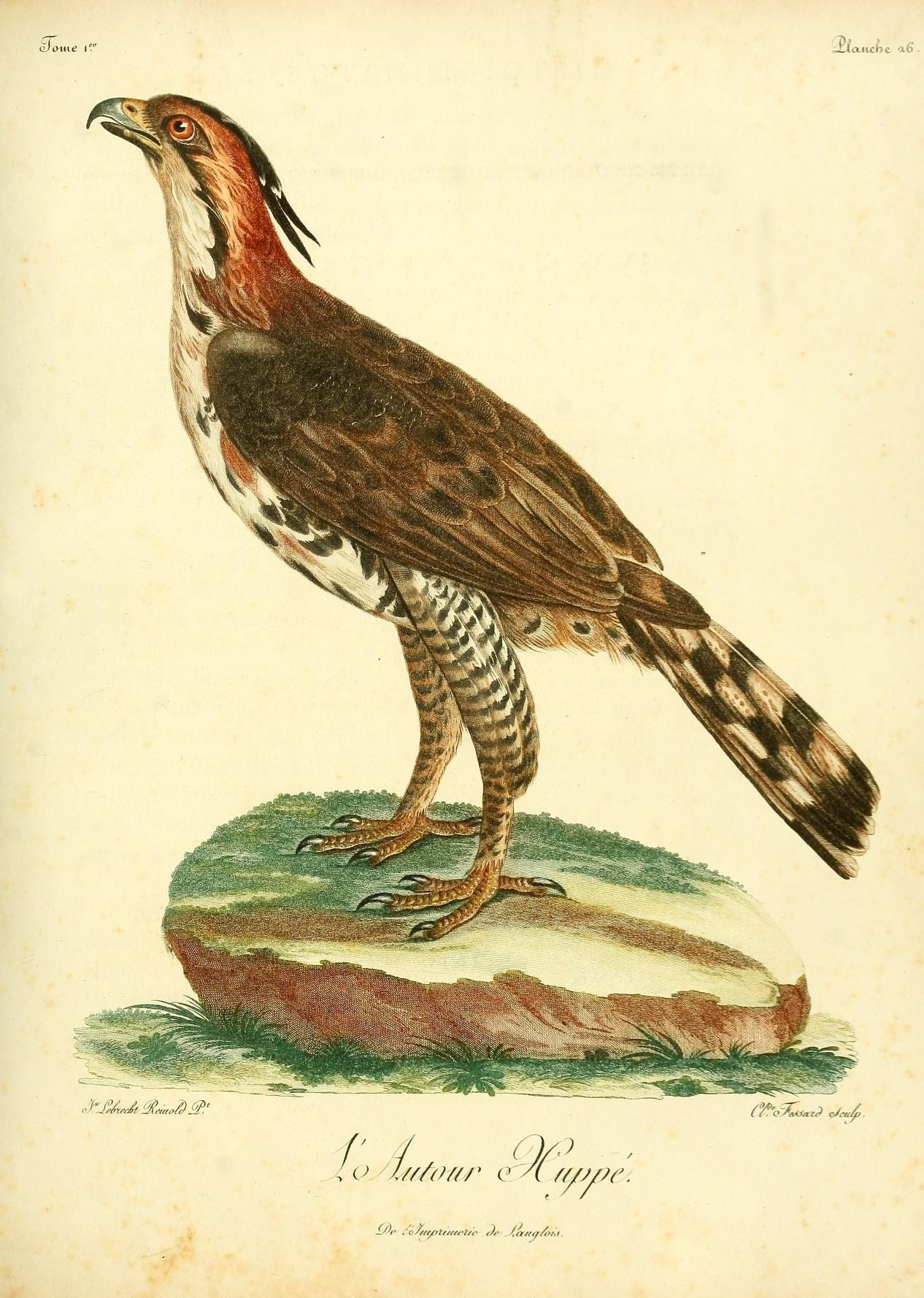
Spizaëtus ornatus, an artist's depiction of it from 1808 or earlier

The ornate hawk-eagle is, like many large birds of prey, probably naturally scarce. However, the species has shown a marked declining trend. Therefore, in 2012, the species was uplisted to Near Threatened. Currently the total population is estimated at between 13,300 and 33,300 individuals, a very small population considering the species' ample range. Various means of analysis in the Atlantic Forest of Brazil all showed it to be least densely populated of the three species of Spizaetus in the area. In particular, when compared to the black hawk-eagle, the ornate hawk-eagle is much less tolerant of partial deforestation and human disturbance and is generally rather more scarce.

For example, in the fragmented forest of Paranapiacaba, Brazil, the black hawk-eagle was recorded 2.5 times more frequently during surveys than the ornate species. The species is locally extinct in several former parts of the range. It is thought to have gone extinct early due to increased extensive 19th century colonization in Tumbes, Peru as well as the Belém and probably the São Francisco regions of Brazil. More recently, the continued presence of breeding ornate hawk-eagles was considered doubtful or at critical threat level in western Ecuador and local biologists considered the species to be extirpated from Colima, Mexico.

Evidence indicates declines are likely occurring in almost every part of the species' distribution. Biologists working in Southeastern Brazil felt that the species, though still present, should be uplisted to regionally critically endangered. Increases or apparent breeding records of the species in new areas are likely not correlated to actual population increases but are more likely cases of the species being driven from adjacent areas as habitats become unacceptable, accounting for increased records of the species at drier forests (i.e., in Mexico) or in higher elevations (i.e., in Colombia). What were considered possible range expansions in different areas of Brazil, such as the Caatinga (Serra das Confusões National Park) and Rio Grande do Sul, as well as in northwestern Peru, may be more likely mere cases of more extensive bird surveying in previously little studied areas. The ornate hawk eagle has a status of rare but persisting on Panamanian islands, Coiba and Barro Colorado Island.

The leading cause, by far, for the species decline is epidemic levels of deforestation. The terribly extensive deforestation of several areas of the neotropics, particularly the Amazon rainforest, was the catalyst for the species being uplisted in 2012. Declines are correlated to deforestation in most parts of the species' range, all the way from the northern limits in Mexico down to the southern limits in Argentina. Even where lands become protected, it is in many cases too late due to forest fragmentation prior to conservation, resulting in stands too fragmented to support extensive use by the ornate hawk-eagles.

Canopy coverage of the forest must be at least 80% in order to retain this hawk-eagle, per a study of its habitat ranging in Los Tuxtlas Biosphere Reserve, Mexico. Beyond deforestation, human hunting is also causing declines of this species. In part this is due to competition for resources. For example, studies in Tikal, Guatemala showed that 49.4% of the biomass at ornate hawk-eagle nests was overlapping with the wild animals most extensively hunted by local humans (i.e., cracids, agoutis, squirrels). Also, where domestic chickens are found, they are opportunistically hunted by ornate hawk-eagle. Due to the causes of wild prey competition and predation of domestic fowl, humans frequently target and shot this and other eagles on sight, even without direct provocation. Little overarching conservation efforts are known to have been implemented specifically pertaining to this species' declines, beyond the general retention and conservation of existing forests.
