= Hans Prade =

Surinam diplomat (1938–2020)

Hans Orlando Prade
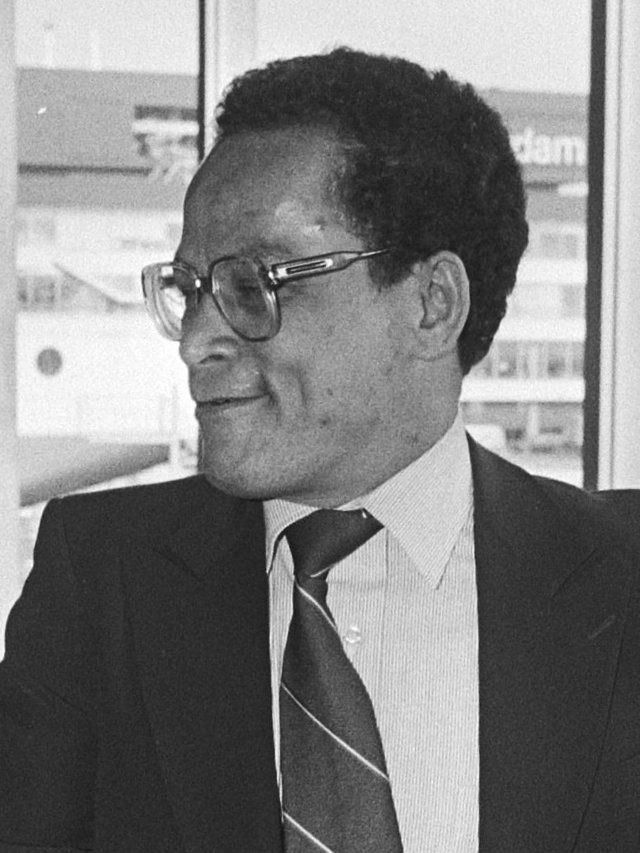
- Hans Prade (1981)

Ambassador of Suriname to the Netherlands
- In office 24 December 1980 – 1 June 1982
- Preceded by: Wim van Eer
- Succeeded by: Henk Herrenberg

Personal details
- Born: 23 July 1938 Suriname
- Died: 3 April 2020 (aged 81) Rotterdam, Netherlands
- Occupation: President of the Surinamese Court of Auditors

Hans Orlando Prade (23 July 1938 – 3 April 2020) was a Surinamese diplomat and politician.

After graduating from Leiden University, Prade returned to Suriname, and founded the short lived Nationale Volkspartij together with Ronald Venetiaan. Later Prade became a member of the Progressieve Nationale Partij. During the coup, Prade was a commentator on Suriname radio.

Prade served as the Surinamese ambassador to the Netherlands from 24 December 1980 until 1 June 1982. His political and undiplomatic statements were not appreciated by the regime and he was dismissed on 1 June 1982.

In 1986, Prade became chairman of the Rekenkamer van Suriname, a position which he held for about 10 years.

In 1991, he tried to run for President of Suriname, but lost out to his former college friend Venetiaan.

In 1998, Prade retired and decided to live with his family in Rotterdam, the Netherlands.

Prade died on 3 April 2020 in Rotterdam, the Netherlands due to COVID-19, aged 81.
