= Wim van Eer =

Surinam minister and diplomat

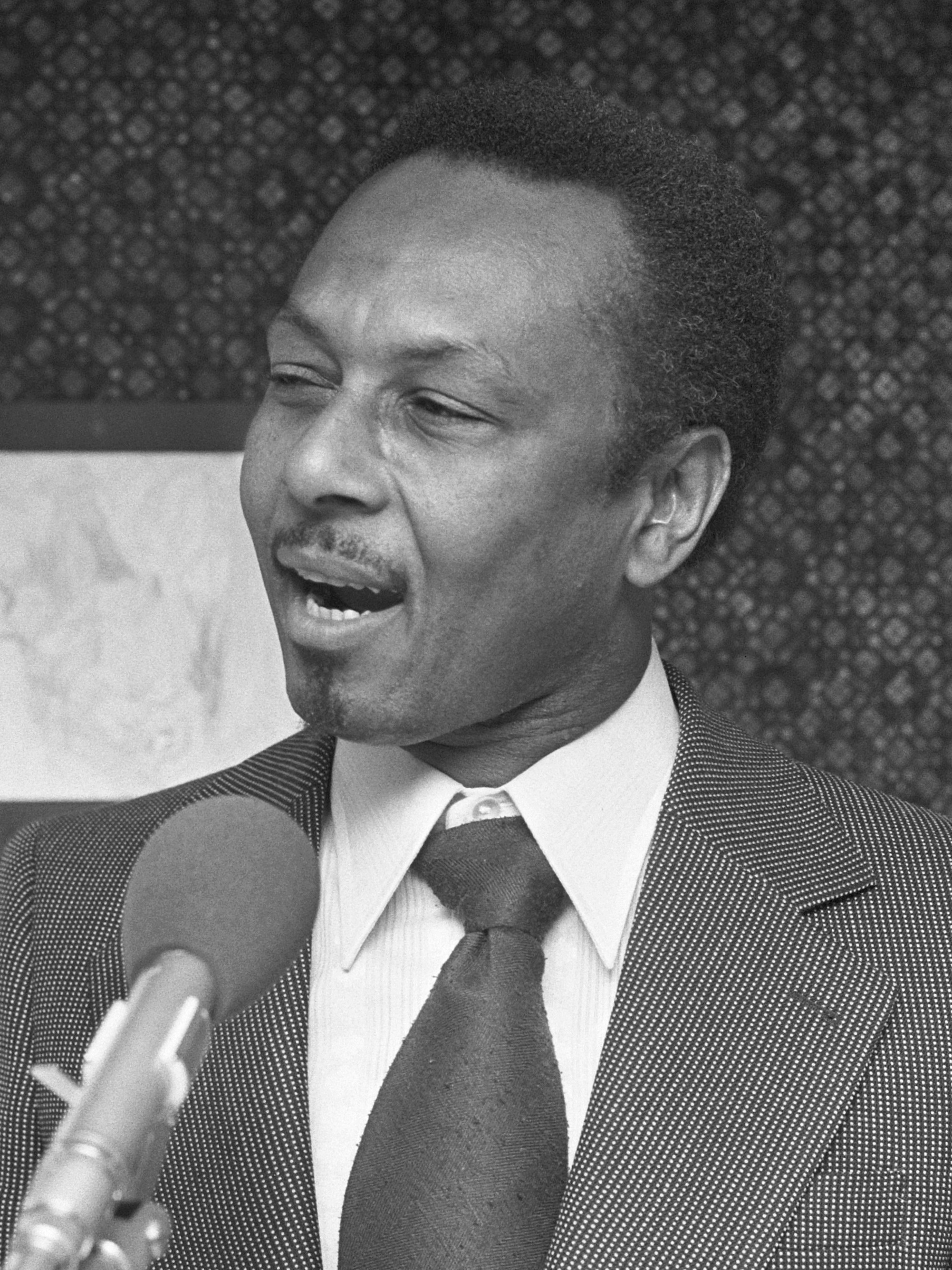
- Wim van Eer (1974)

Ambassador of Suriname to the Netherlands
- In office 25 November 1975 – 20 May 1980
- Preceded by: position established
- Succeeded by: Hans Prade

Minister Plenipotentiary of Suriname
- In office 1 April 1974 – 25 November 1975
- Preceded by: Desi Polanen
- Succeeded by: position abolished

Personal details
- Born: Willem Frederik van Eer; 19 December 1927 Paramaribo, Surinam
- Died: 2 July 2011 (aged 83) Paramaribo, Suriname
- Party: National Party of Suriname
- Occupation: diplomat, educator

Willem Frederik "Wim" van Eer (19 December 1927 – 2 July 2011) was a Surinamese diplomat and educator. He served as Minister Plenipotentiary of Suriname from 1 April 1974 until the Independence of Suriname on 25 November 1975. Subsequently, he was appointed first Ambassador of Suriname to the Netherlands and served until 20 May 1980.

== Biography ==
Van Eer was born on 19 December 1927 in Paramaribo. He studied pedagogy at the Nuts Academy in Rotterdam, and subsequently at the University of Utrecht. Van Eer was one of the founders of the Surinamese in Rotterdam Foundation. In 1964, he returned to Suriname and became the principal of the kweekschool (normal school) in Paramaribo. He became a member of the National Party of Suriname.

Henck Arron appointed van Eer as Minister Plenipotentiary of Suriname on 1 April 1974. He played an important role in the negotiations for Independence of Suriname. On 25 November 1975, his function became obsolete, and he was appointed as first Ambassador of Suriname to the Netherlands.

On 25 February 1980, Desi Bouterse committed a coup d'état On 11 March, van Eer returned to Suriname to negotiate with the new regime. He was honourably discharged effective 20 May 1980, and reassigned to the Ministry of Foreign Affairs. On 24 December, Hans Prade was appointed as his successor.

Van Eer died on 2 July 2011 in Paramaribo, at the age of 83.

== Honours ==
- Commander of the Honorary Order of the Palm.
