= Koninkrijksdag =

Public holiday in the Netherlands

- Observed by: Kingdom of the Netherlands (Netherlands, Aruba, Curaçao, and Sint Maarten)
- Significance: The commemoration of the signing of the Charter of the Kingdom of the Netherlands
- Date: 15 December (If a Sunday, on Monday 16 December)
- 2025 date: 15 December
- 2026 date: 15 December
- 2027 date: 15 December
- 2028 date: 15 December
- Frequency: annual

Koninkrijksdag (Papiamento: Dia di Reino, English: Kingdom Day) is the commemoration of the signing of the Charter for the Kingdom of the Netherlands on 15 December 1954 in Aruba, Curaçao, the Netherlands, and Sint Maarten. When 15 December falls on a Sunday, the commemoration takes place on Monday 16 December. Kingdom Day is, unlike Koningsdag (English: King's Day), not an official national holiday, but government buildings are instructed to fly the flag of the Netherlands.

The charter was signed by Queen Juliana on 15 December 1954. The charter deals with the relation between the Netherlands and the overseas territories, the Netherlands Antilles, Dutch New Guinea and Suriname. As of 2010, the charter governs the relationships between the Netherlands, Aruba (since 1986), Curaçao and Sint Maarten (since 2010).

Since 2005, the Koninkrijksconcert (English: Kingdom Concert) is annually held on 15 December, to celebrate the relationship between the Netherlands, Aruba, Curaçao, and Sint Maarten. Before 2010, the concert celebrated the relationship with the Netherlands Antilles instead of Curaçao and Sint Maarten.

In 2008, Naturalisatiedag (English: Naturalisation Day) in the Kingdom of the Netherlands was moved from 24 August, the day on which the Constitution of the Netherlands was signed, to 15 December, the day on which Queen Juliana signed the Charter for the Kingdom of the Netherlands. On Naturalisation Day, newly naturalized citizens officially receive their Dutch citizenship.
