= Minister Plenipotentiary (Netherlands) =

Dutch Caribbean representative to the Kingdom of the Netherlands

A minister plenipotentiary (Dutch: gevolmachtigd minister) represents the government of one of the Caribbean constituent countries as part of the Kingdom of the Netherlands. The minister is part of the government of that country, but resides in the Netherlands, where they are part of the Council of Ministers of the Kingdom of the Netherlands.

== Description ==
Dutch ministers answer to the Dutch parliament for their actions and policies, while ministers plenipotentiary answer to their own national governments instead. Therefore, the ministers plenipotentiary usually do not resign in the event of a Dutch cabinet crisis.

=== Ministers plenipotentiary ===
The following three ministers plenipotentiary currently exist:

- Minister Plenipotentiary of Aruba (est. 1986)
- Minister Plenipotentiary of Curaçao (est. 2010)
- Minister Plenipotentiary of Sint Maarten (est. 2010)

In addition ministers plenipotentiary have existed for the former Caribbean Netherlands Antilles (1954−2010) before its dissolution; and for the former South American colony of Suriname (1667–1954) before its independence.

- Minister Plenipotentiary of the Netherlands Antilles (1954–2010)
- Minister Plenipotentiary of Suriname (1954–1975)
