= Raymond Pos =

Surinamese diplomat and lawyer

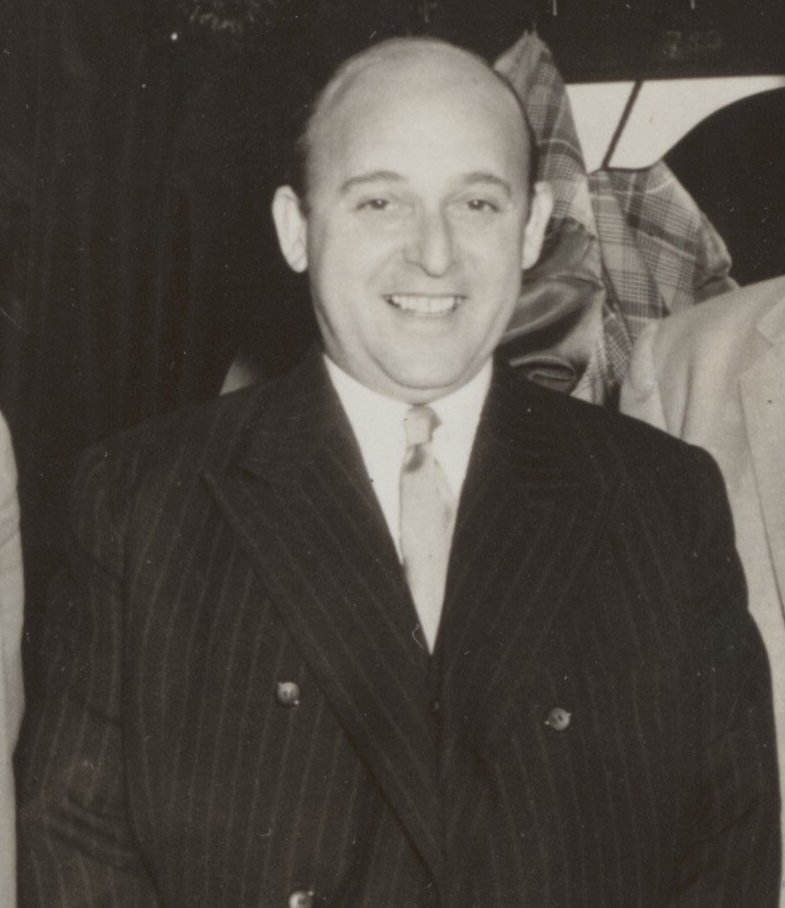
- Raymond Pos (1954)

Ambassador of the Netherlands to Cuba
- In office July 1963 – 5 November 1964

Minister Plenipotentiary of Suriname
- In office 29 December 1954 – 1 August 1963
- Preceded by: position established
- Succeeded by: Severinus Emanuels

Personal details
- Born: Raymond Henri Pos; 9 March 1910 Paramaribo, Surinam
- Died: 5 November 1964 (aged 54) Willemstad, Curaçao
- Party: Independent
- Occupation: diplomat, lawyer

Raymond Henri Pos (9 March 1910 – 5 November 1964) was a Surinamese diplomat and lawyer. He was the first Minister Plenipotentiary of Suriname from 29 December 1954 until 1 August 1963. Subsequently, he was appointed Dutch Ambassador of Cuba. Pos played a major role in the creation of the 1954 Charter for the Kingdom of the Netherlands which established the political relationship between the Netherlands and its former colonies.

== Biography ==
Pos was born on 9 March 1910 in a Jewish family who had been living in Suriname for generations. He left Suriname for the Netherlands to study at the grammar school in Alkmaar and studied law at Leiden University. He was promoted in 1939 for his thesis "Evenredige vertegenwoordiging en volksvertegenwoordiging" ("Proportional representation and people's representation").

Pos returned to Suriname, and worked for the Justice Department. He was promoted deputy attorney general in 1942. In November 1947, Pos was appointed representative for Suriname in the Netherlands. A better representation was needed, and in January 1949, Henry Lucien de Vries succeeded him as commissioner. In 1953, Pos was appointed Chairman of the Suriname delegation to the Second Round Table Conference in The Hague to establish a new relation between the Netherlands and its former colonies. He would become one of the main authors of the Charter for the Kingdom of the Netherlands in which Suriname became a constituent country within the Kingdom of the Netherlands.

On 29 December 1954, Pos was appointed Minister Plenipotentiary of Suriname, and served until 1 August 1963. In July 1963, he was appointed Ambassador of the Netherlands to Cuba with an accreditation for Haiti.

In 1964, the Estates of Suriname nominated Pos as Governor-General to replace Currie. The nomination was returned by the States General of the Netherlands, because it only contained one name. On 29 October 1964, he was present on a Netherlands Antilles ambassador reception in Bonaire. During the reception, he became unwell, and was taken to hospital in Willemstad, Curaçao. Pos died on 5 November 1964, at the age of 54.

== Family ==
Raymond Pos was the older brother of the judge and author Hugo Pos.

In 1951, he married Elizabeth Wakkie, former editor of Het Vaderland, in the Hague.

== Honours ==
- Commander of the Order of Orange-Nassau.
- Knight of the Order of the Netherlands Lion.
