= Desi Polanen =

Surinamese politician

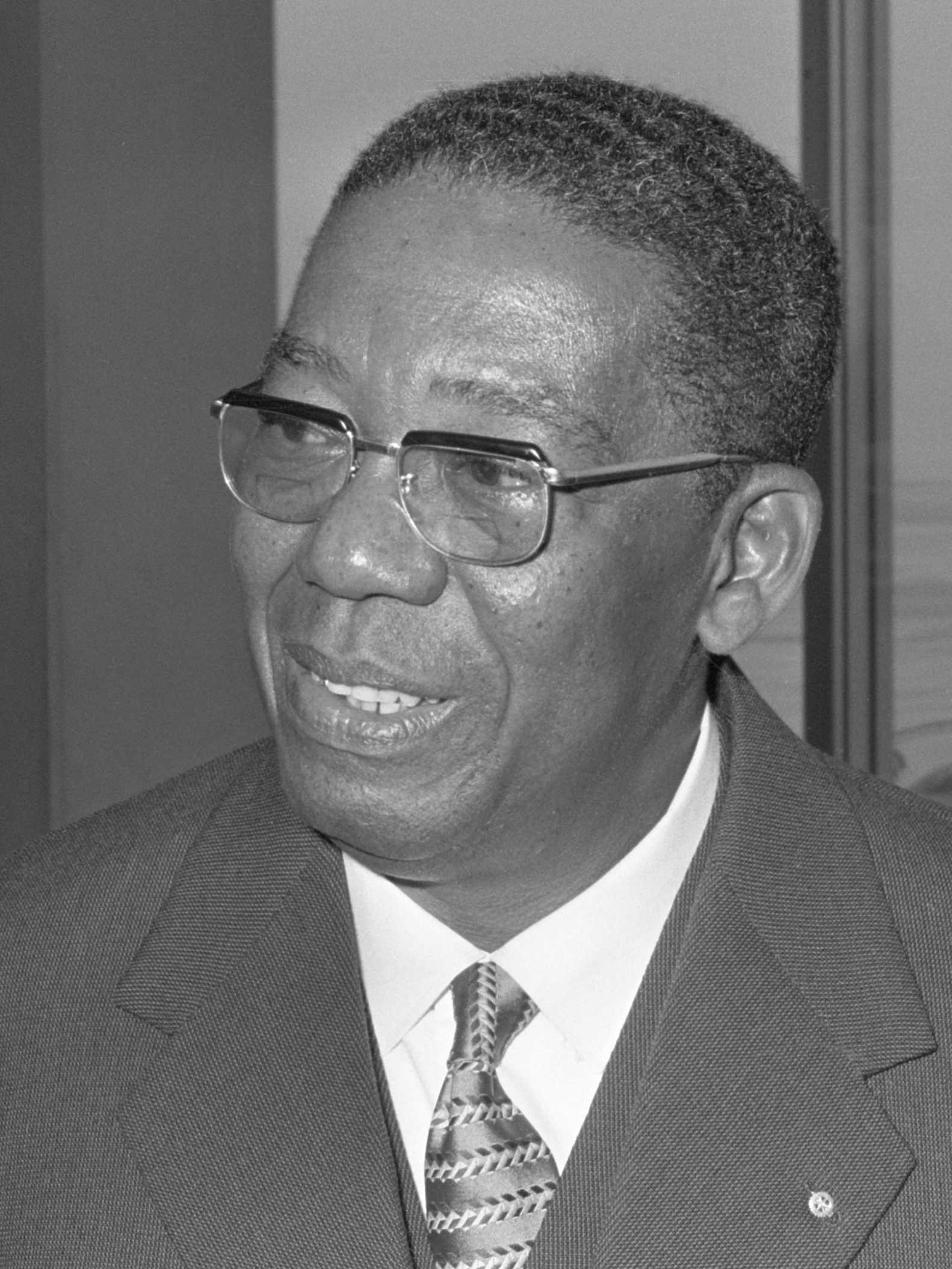
- Desi Polanen (1970)

Minister Plenipotentiary of Suriname
- In office 1 January 1970 – 1 April 1974
- Preceded by: Walter Lim A Po
- Succeeded by: Wim van Eer

Personal details
- Born: Jean-fils Désiré Victor Polanen; 16 May 1913 Paramaribo, Surinam
- Died: 17 May 1994 (aged 81) Driebergen, Netherlands
- Party: Progressive National Party
- Occupation: diplomat, politician, dentist

Jean-fils Désiré Victor (Desi) Polanen (16 May 1913 – 17 May 1994) was a Surinamese politician and diplomat.

== Biography ==
After finishing gymnasium in Haarlem, he went to study at Columbia University in New York after which he took dental exams back in the Netherlands in 1948. In 1954, he obtained his doctorate in oral surgery cum laude in Hamburg, West Germany, with the thesis Die Zahnextraktion in bakteriologischer Sicht. In the years 1946 and 1947 he already had a private dental practice in Aruba and after his doctorate, he had a private dental practice in Suriname.

In addition, he was president of several organizations such as the dental association in Paramaribo, the Moravian Church and the deaconess hospital in Paramaribo (also co-founder).

Besides all of this, he was also politically active. In 1961 Het Parool published an article in which he stated that Surinamese ministers were corrupt. In response, R.H. Pos, then minister plenipotentiary of Suriname, came with a telegram. In it Polanen was portrayed as an unimportant figure in which it was also subtly mentioned that his brother Pieter, as the leader of a gang, had committed attacks against government personnel. Reference was made to a clumsily executed failed attack against J. Pengel. Furthermore, around 1962 Polanen founded a new political party together with G.J.C. van der Schroeff: Waarom Iets Nieuws (English: Why Something New)(WIN).

Not long after, he was one of the signers of a petition by the National Committee Against Independence-Now. After the elections of Oct. 24, 1969, a cabinet was formed led by Sedney, himself belonging to the Progressive National Party (PNP), and the same party nominated Polanen as Minister Plenipotentiary of Suriname in the Netherlands.

On Jan. 1, 1970, Polanen took over that position from Walter Lim A Po. He would remain in office until the end of February 1974 after which he worked for some time as a dentist in Aerdenhout, North Holland. He died in the Netherlands in 1994 at the age of 81.

== Bibliography ==
- Die Zahnextraktion in bakteriologischer Sicht (dissertation), Hamburg, 1955
- Herinneringen aan mijn vader Johannes Hendrik Nelson Polanen. De eerste neger-hoofdonderwijzer in Suriname (1882-1939), Paramaribo, 1982 (self-published)

Preceded by W. Lim A Po	Minister Plenipotentiary of Suriname; 1970 - 1974	Succeeded by W.F. van Eer
