= Henry Lucien de Vries =

Surinamese politician and entrepreneur

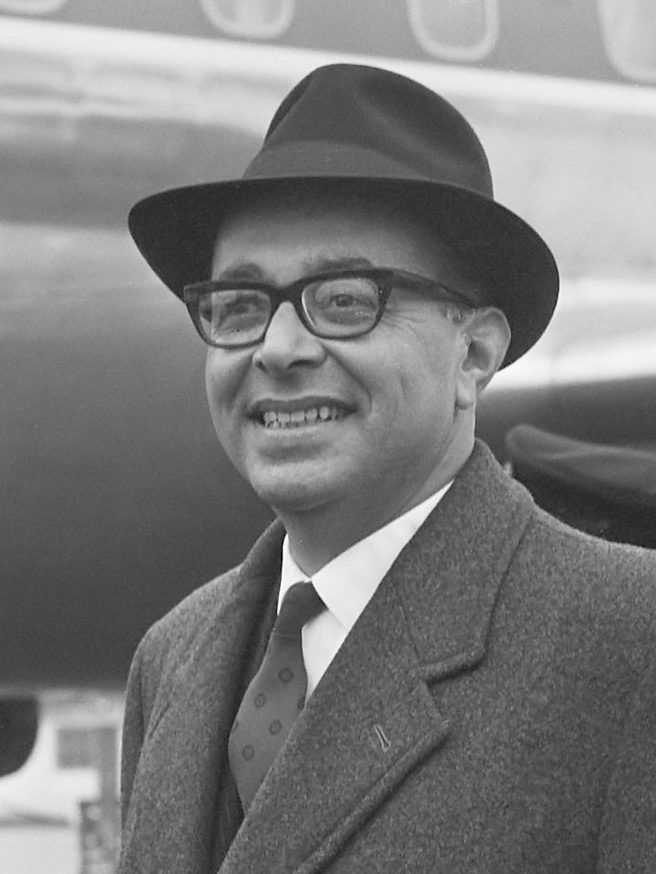
- Henry Lucien de Vries in 1966

Governor-General of Suriname
- In office 26 February 1965 – 12 August 1968
- Monarch: Juliana
- Preceded by: François Haverschmidt
- Succeeded by: Johan Ferrier

Personal details
- Born: 12 December 1909; Paramaribo, Suriname
- Died: 6 April 1987 (aged 77); Leiden, Netherlands

Henry Lucien de Vries (12 December 1909 – 6 April 1987) was a Surinamese politician and entrepreneur.

De Vries was born in Paramaribo. He studied economics at the Netherlands School of Economics and law at the University of Amsterdam. He was also trained as an officer at the Royal Military Academy Sandhurst. In 1946, he joined De Surinaamsche Bank, where he became a member of the management board.

He served as the Chairman of the Estates of Suriname from 1947 to 1949. Raymond Pos was initially nominated as Governor of Suriname, however he died on 5 November 1964. De Vries was Governor of Suriname from 1965 to 1968. He was the half-brother of the artist Erwin de Vries.
