= Charter for the Kingdom of the Netherlands =

Aruba-Curaçao-Sint Maarten-Netherlands legal instrument

The Charter for the Kingdom of the Netherlands (in Dutch: Statuut voor het Koninkrijk der Nederlanden; in Papiamentu: Statuut di Reino Hulandes) is the principal constitutional instrument governing the relationship among the four countries that constitute the Kingdom of the Netherlands: Aruba, Curaçao, Sint Maarten and the Netherlands. It is the highest constitutional instrument within the Kingdom; the Constitution of the Netherlands and the Staatsregelingen (constitutions) of Aruba, Curaçao and Sint Maarten are subordinate to it.

== History ==
The original Charter established a new constitutional relationship among the Netherlands, Suriname and the Netherlands Antilles. Queen Juliana confirmed the Charter on 15 December 1954, and it was formally proclaimed on 29 December 1954, when the new constitutional order entered into force.

Suriname ceased to be part of the Kingdom on 25 November 1975 upon becoming an independent republic. The statutory relationship with Suriname was terminated by a Kingdom Act of 22 November 1975.

On 1 January 1986, Aruba separated constitutionally from the Netherlands Antilles and became a separate country within the Kingdom. Its status as a country, initially established for a transitional period, was continued for an indefinite period from 1 January 1996.

The Netherlands Antilles ceased to exist as a country on 10 October 2010. Curaçao and Sint Maarten became separate countries within the Kingdom, while Bonaire, Sint Eustatius and Saba became part of the constitutional system of the Netherlands as public bodies.

== Countries ==
Article 1 of the Charter provides that the Kingdom comprises four countries: the Netherlands, Aruba, Curaçao and Sint Maarten. The Caribbean islands of Bonaire, Sint Eustatius and Saba form part of the country of the Netherlands rather than constituting separate countries of the Kingdom.

Article 42 provides that the constitutional organisation of the Netherlands is regulated in the Constitution of the Netherlands, while the constitutional organisation of Aruba, Curaçao and Sint Maarten is regulated in their respective Staatsregelingen. Each country otherwise manages its own internal affairs autonomously, subject to the provisions of the Charter.

== Constitution ==
Before the Charter entered into force in 1954, the Constitution was the highest national constitutional instrument of the Kingdom. Since 29 December 1954, the Charter has taken precedence over the Constitution. Article 5 of the Charter nevertheless provides that the monarchy, succession to the throne, the institutions of the Kingdom mentioned in the Charter, and the exercise of royal and legislative authority in Kingdom affairs are regulated by the Constitution insofar as the Charter itself does not regulate them.

Article 5 also expressly requires the Constitution to observe the provisions of the Charter, while Article 48 requires the countries to observe the Charter in their legislation and administration. The resulting constitutional structure therefore combines institutions established primarily under Dutch constitutional law with additional rules applying to those institutions when they act at the level of the Kingdom.

== Affairs of the Kingdom ==
The Charter distinguishes between affairs of the Kingdom and affairs belonging to the individual countries. Article 3 identifies a number of subjects as Kingdom affairs, while Article 3(2) permits other subjects to be designated as Kingdom affairs by common agreement. Matters that are not Kingdom affairs are, in principle, handled autonomously by the individual countries.

Kingdom affairs are handled through cooperation among the four countries. The Council of Ministers of the Kingdom of the Netherlands consists of the Dutch ministers together with the Ministers Plenipotentiary appointed by Aruba, Curaçao and Sint Maarten.

Article 3 identifies the following as affairs of the Kingdom:

- maintenance of the independence and defence of the Kingdom;
- foreign relations;
- Netherlands nationality;
- regulation of the orders of chivalry, the flag and the coat of arms of the Kingdom;
- regulation of the nationality of vessels and standards concerning the safety and navigation of seagoing vessels flying the flag of the Kingdom, except sailing ships;
- supervision of general rules concerning the admission and expulsion of Netherlands nationals;
- general conditions concerning the admission and expulsion of aliens; and
- extradition.

Other subjects may be made affairs of the Kingdom by mutual agreement, using the amendment procedure referred to in Article 55.

== Other provisions ==
Articles 36 and 37 of the Charter regulate mutual assistance, consultation and cooperation. Article 36 provides that the Netherlands, Aruba, Curaçao and Sint Maarten shall provide one another with help and assistance, while Article 37 provides for consultation on matters involving the interests of two or more countries.

Under Article 43, each country is responsible for promoting the realisation of fundamental human rights and freedoms, legal certainty and good governance. Safeguarding those principles is an affair of the Kingdom.

Article 55 governs amendments to the Charter. An amendment is made by Kingdom Act, and a proposal adopted by the States General cannot receive royal approval until it has also been accepted by Aruba, Curaçao and Sint Maarten through legislation adopted in those countries. The procedure therefore requires the agreement of all four countries of the Kingdom.

== See also ==
- Koninkrijksdag
