= Council of Ministers of the Kingdom of the Netherlands =

The Council of Ministers of the Kingdom (Dutch: Ministerraad van het Koninkrijk or Rijksministerraad) is the executive council of the Kingdom of the Netherlands, which is a state consisting of four constituent countries: Aruba, Curaçao, the Netherlands, and Sint Maarten.

Their main duty is to prepare legislation or decisions that concern the entire kingdom and the joint interests of the kingdom, which is then signed by the king.

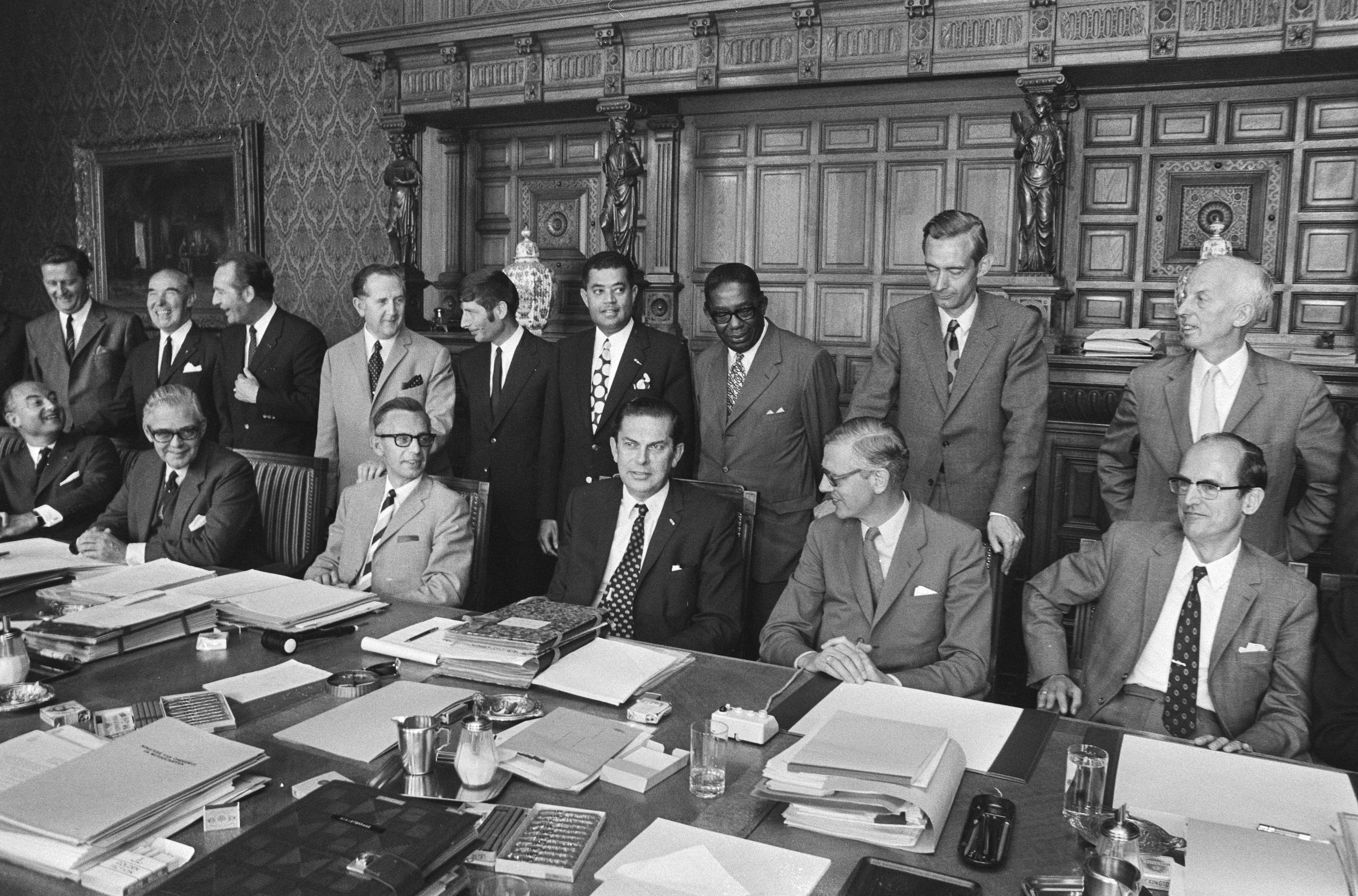
Meeting in 1971 of the Council of Ministers of the Kingdom under supervision of the premier Barend Biesheuvel (middle). Behind him are the Plenipotentiary Ministers of Suriname and the Netherlands Antilles, Desi Polanen and Boy Rozendal.

Designs of Kingdom Acts and General Measures of Kingdom Governance (Dutch: Algemene maatregel van rijksbestuur) are discussed by the Council of Ministers of the Kingdom before they go to the Council of State of the Kingdom (Dutch: Raad van State van het Koninkrijk)

The Council of Ministers of the Kingdom consists of the Council of Ministers of the Netherlands complemented by one Minister Plenipotentiary of Aruba, one Minister Plenipotentiary of Curaçao, and one Minister Plenipotentiary of Sint Maarten. The Prime Minister of the Netherlands chairs the Council of Ministers of the Kingdom. Together with the King, the Council of Ministers of the Kingdom forms the Government of the Kingdom, also known as the Crown.

From 1955 till 1975, this included a Minister Plenipotentiary of Suriname.

From 1955 till 2010, this included a Minister Plenipotentiary of The Netherlands Antilles.

A significant difference between the Netherlands Ministers and the Ministers Plenipotentiary is that the former Ministers are accountable for their politics and policies to the Dutch parliament. The Ministers Plenipotentiary, however, are accountable to their national governments. Therefore, the Ministers Plenipotentiary usually do not resign in the event of a Dutch cabinet crisis.

Though the Kingdom of the Netherlands is statutorily distinguished from its constituent country of the Netherlands, the Council of Ministers, while mentioned in the Statute is, according to Article 5 of the Statute regulated by the Constitution. With adaptions regulated by the Statute for circumstances the Statute provides for certain situations, being affairs of the Kingdom that directly affect Curaçao, Aruba or Sint Maarten.

Laws applicable to the whole Kingdom are known as Kingdom Acts. An example of such a law is the "Kingdom Act regarding Dutch citizenship" (Dutch: Rijkswet op het Nederlanderschap).
