= François Haverschmidt (ornithologist) =

Dutch judge and ornithologist

Governor-General of Suriname (Acting)
- In office 22 August 1964 – 26 February 1965
- Preceded by: Archibald Currie
- Succeeded by: Henry Lucien de Vries

Personal details
- Born: 21 June 1906; Utrecht, Netherlands
- Died: 28 April 1987 (aged 80); Zwolle, Netherlands
- Occupation: judge, ornithologist, politician

François Haverschmidt (21 June 1906 – 28 April 1987) was a Dutch judge who served in Suriname and also took an interest in birds, writing a major work The Birds of Surinam (1968).

Haverschmidt was born in Utrecht to François and Catharina Jacoba Johanna Verbroeck. His grandfather François Haverschmidt wrote under the pseudonym Piet Paaltjens. As a young boy he was part of a birdwatchers group along with his friend Jan Verwey (1899–1981). In 1924 he became a member of the Nederlandsche Ornithologische Vereeniging and published his first article in the journal Ardea in 1925.

Haverschmidt studied law at the University of Utrecht and worked as a clerk in the courts of Utrecht, Haarlem (1936–1938), Heerlen (1938–1941) and Leeuwarden (1941–1946) before moving to Paramaribo, Suriname as a judge. While serving in Suriname, he found that despite work done by the Penard brothers and Charles Chubb, there were great gaps in knowledge. So he began to make collections and sent them to museums, initially to John Todd Zimmer at the American Museum of Natural History but after Zimmer's death in 1957, he sent specimens to Rijksmuseum van Natuurlijke Historie in Leiden. He sent nearly 9800 specimens over his lifetime. He also began to put together his notes and this resulted in the 1968 book, The Birds of Surinam with art by Paul Barruel. It was revised by Gerlof Fokko Mees in 1994.

Haverschmidt became chief justice of the Supreme Court and served as interim governor of Suriname on three occasions. For his service he was made Knight of the Order of the Netherlands Lion and Officer of the Order of Orange-Nassau.
