= Martial (disambiguation) =

Martial was a 1st-century Roman poet.

Martial may refer to something of military style or warlike, for instance martial arts.

Martial may also refer to:

== People ==
- Saint Martial, 3rd-century bishop of Limoges
- Martial Bild (born 1961), French journalist and politician
- Martial Caillebotte (1853–1910), French philatelist, photographer and composer
- Martial Célestin (1913–2011), Prime Minister of Haiti in 1988
- Martial Gueroult (1891–1976), French philosopher
- Martial Mbandjock (born 1985), French sprinter
- Martial Henri Merlin (1860–1935), French colonial administrator
- Martial Raysse (born 1936), French artist and actor
- Martial Robin (born 1977), French footballer
- Martial Singher (1904–1990), French baritone opera singer
- Martial Solal (1927–2024), French-Algerian jazz pianist and composer
- Martial Yao (born 1989), Ivorian footballer
- Anthony Martial (born 1995), French footballer, brother of Johan Martial and cousin of Alexis Martial
- Alexis Martial (born 2001), French footballer
- Carlton Martial (born 1999), American football player
- Johan Martial (born 1991), French footballer
- Romain Martial (born 1984), French rugby union player
- Yeo Martial (born 1944), Ivorian football manager

== Other uses ==
- Martial law, suspension of civil law
- Martial Mountains, Argentina
- Martial (crater), a crater on Mercury
- Martial (horse), an Irish thoroughbred racehorse
- Martial eagle, a species of eagle

== See also ==
- Marital, of or related to marriage
- Martialis (disambiguation)
