= Martialis (disambiguation) =

Martialis most commonly refers to Martial (c. 39 – c. 103 AD), a poet in ancient Rome.

Martialis may also refer to:

== Ancient Roman cognomen ==
- Aulus Vicirius Martialis (fl. 98–113/114), Roman senator during the reign of Trajan
- Lucius Caesius Martialis, consul suffectus in AD 57
- Publius Aelius Martialis, third-century soldier
- Quintus Gargilius Martialis (died before 260), third-century writer on horticulture, botany and medicine
- Quintus Rammius Martialis (fl. 111–119), equestrian who held at least two important appointments during the reign of the emperors Trajan and Hadrian

== Given name ==
- Saint Martial, also spelled Martialis, 3rd century Roman Catholic and Eastern Orthodox saint and first bishop of Limoges
- Martialis of Columnata (fl. 484 AD), Catholic bishop in North Africa
- Martial Auribelli (died 1473), also spelled Martialis, Master General of the Dominican Order

== Other uses ==
- Martialis (ant), a genus of ants

== See also ==
- Martial (disambiguation)
