= Booted eagles =

Eagles having feathered legs

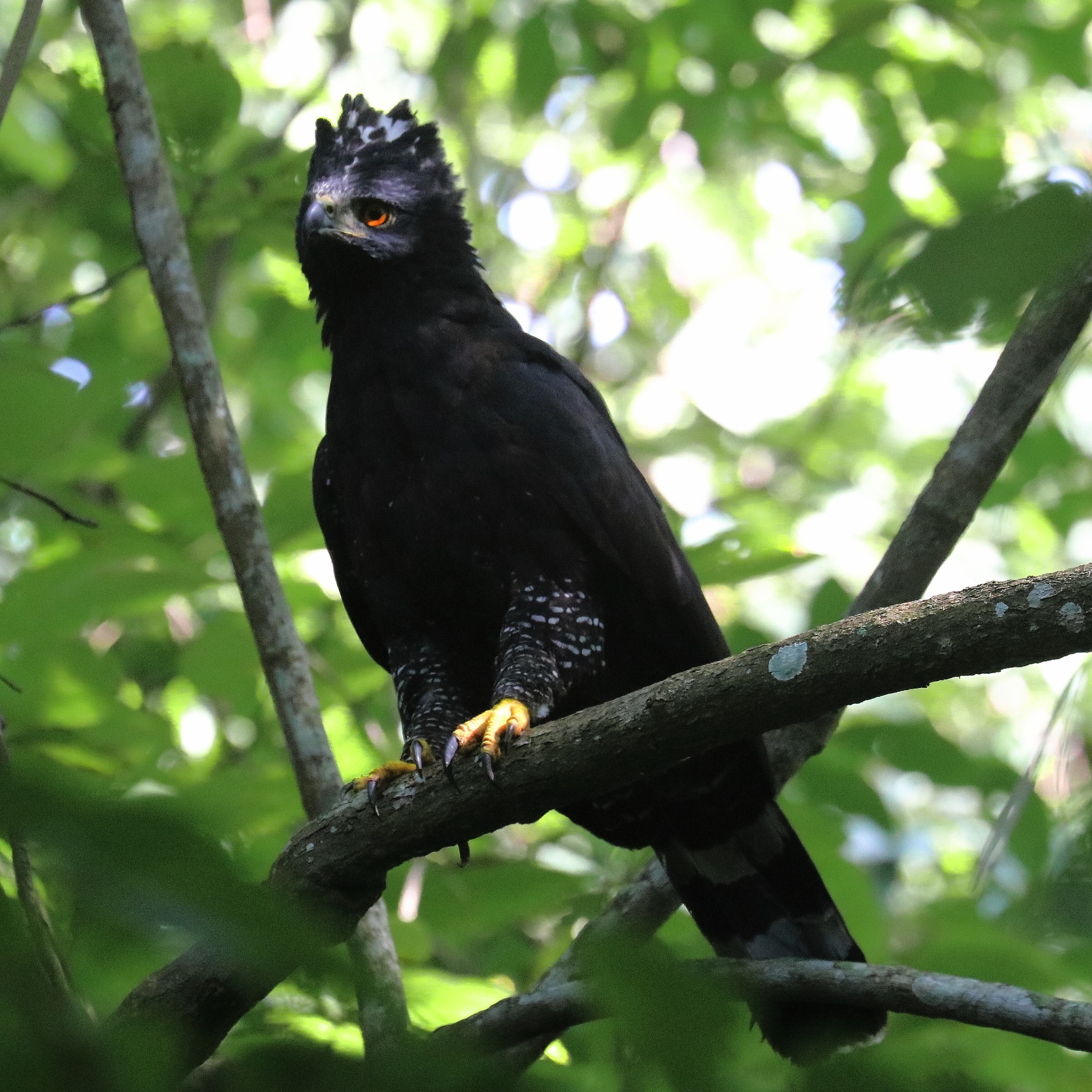
Black hawk-eagle (Spizaetus tyrannus)

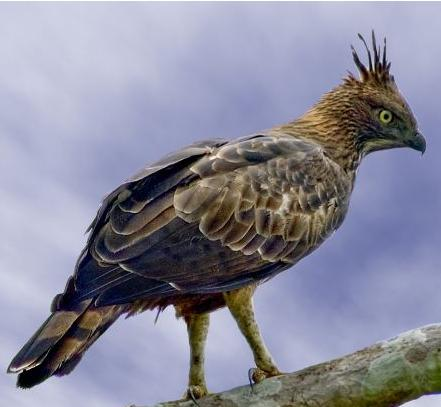
Changeable hawk-eagle (Nisaetus cirrhatus)

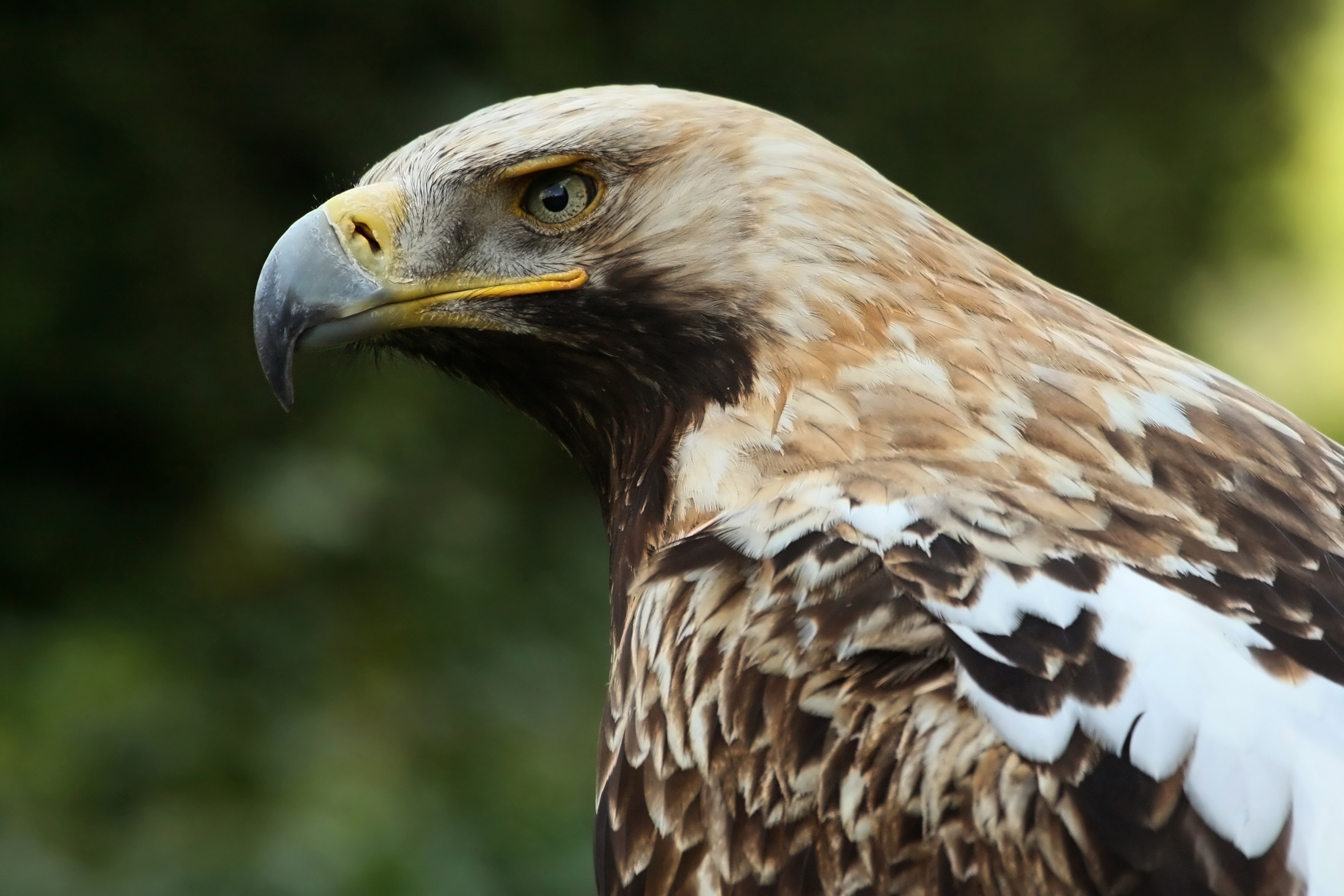
Eastern imperial eagle (Aquila heliaca)

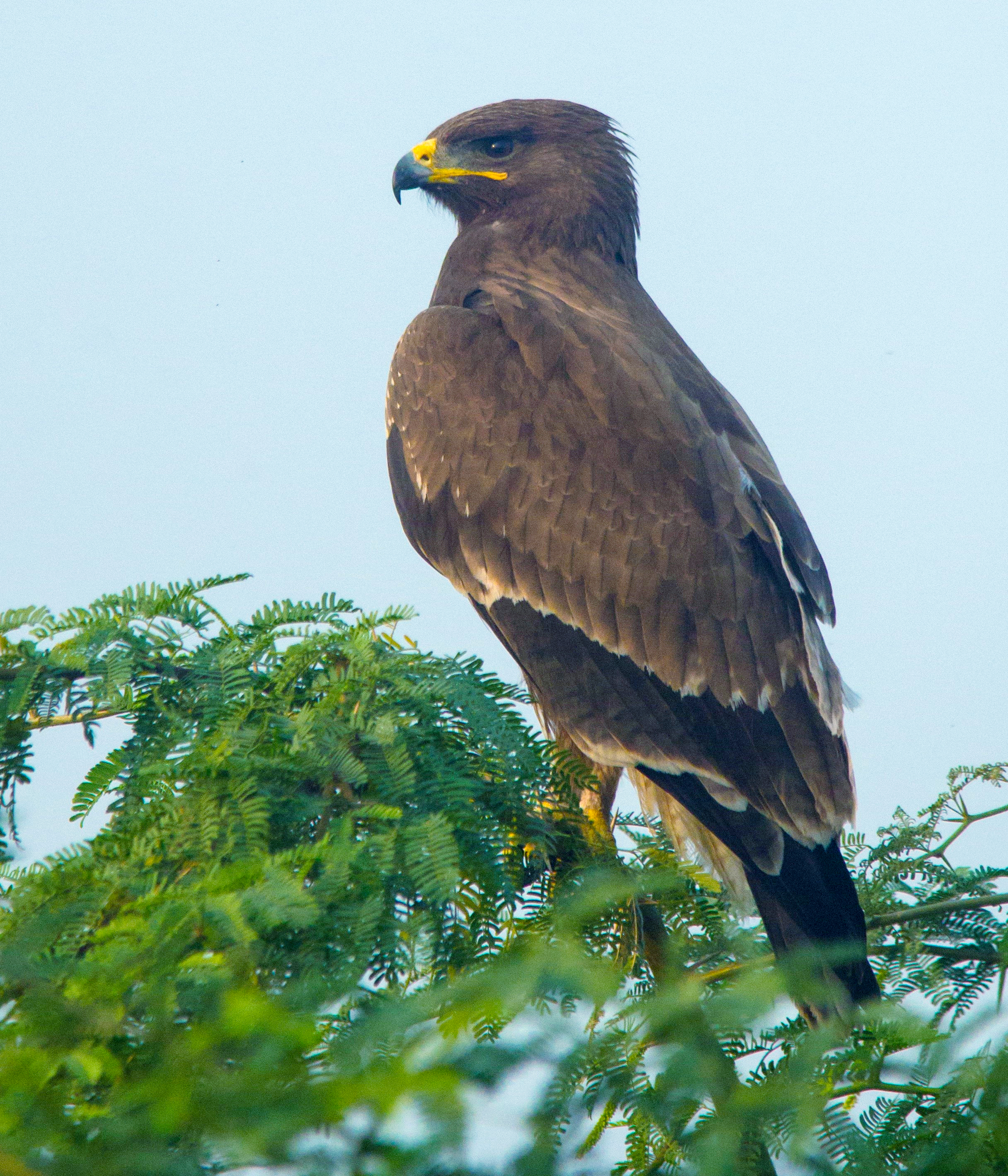
Indian spotted eagle (Clanga hastata)

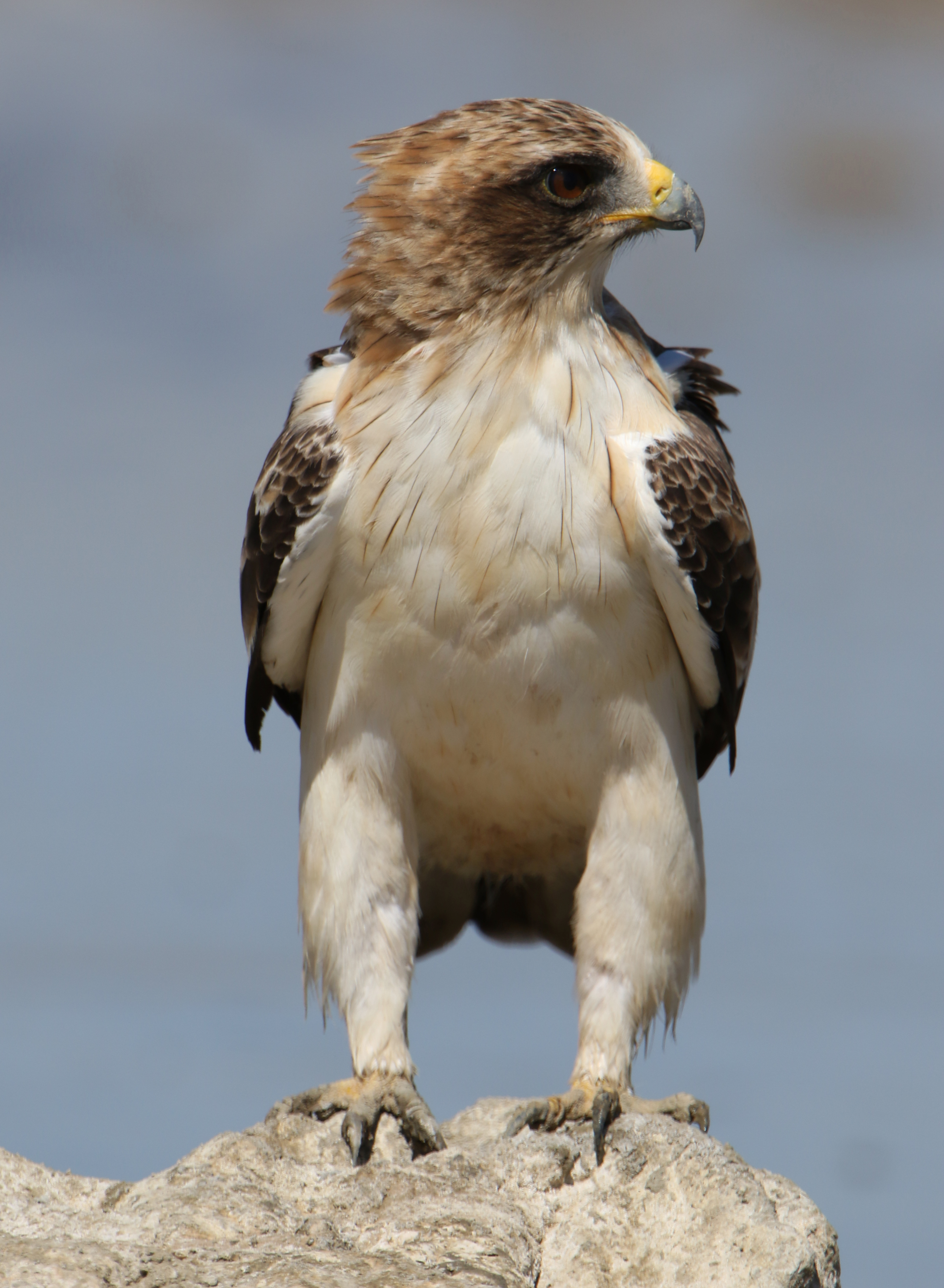
Booted eagle (Hieraaetus pennatus)

Booted eagles are eagles that have fully feathered tarsi. That is, their legs are covered with feathers down to the feet. Most other accipitrids have bare lower legs, scaled rather than feathered.

They may be treated as an informal group, as distinct from "fish eagles" (or "sea eagles"), "snake eagles", and "giant forest eagles". (Note: "There are four major groups of eagles: fish eagles, booted eagles, snake eagles and giant forest eagles.") They may also be treated as a formal taxon, either as a tribe (Aquililae) or subfamily (Aquilinae).

The booted eagles, sea eagles, harpy eagles and buteonine hawks are heavily built birds that have traditionally been classified together in the large subfamily Buteoninae. In 2005, Heather Lerner and David Mindell proposed separating the eagles into their own subfamilies Aquilinae, Haliaeetinae, and Harpiinae, leaving only the buteo–buteogallus clade in a more restricted Buteoninae.

Included in the booted eagles are the genera Aquila, Hieraaetus and Clanga; all species described as "hawk eagles" including the genera Spizaetus and Nisaetus; as well as assorted monotypical genera such as Oroaetus, Lophaetus, Stephanoaetus, Polemaetus, Lophotriorchis and Ictinaetus.

== Aquila eagles ==
The genus Aquila is distributed across every continent but for South America and Antarctica. Up to 20 species have been classified in the genus but the taxonomic placement of some of the traditionally included species has recently been questioned. Traditionally, the Aquila eagles have been grouped superficially as largish, mainly brownish or dark-colored booted eagles that vary little in transition from their juvenile to their adult plumages.

Genetic research has recently indicated a clade containing the near-circumpolar golden eagle (Aquila chrysaetos), Verreaux's eagle (A. verreauxii) of Africa, Asian Gurney's eagle (A. gurneyi) and the Australian wedge-tailed eagle (A. audax). This identification of this particular clade has long been suspected based on similar morphological characteristics amongst these large-bodied species.

More surprisingly, the smaller, much paler-bellied species pair Bonelli's eagle (A. fasciatus) and African hawk-eagle (A. spilogaster), previously included in the genus Hieraaetus, have been revealed to be genetically much closer to the Verreaux's and golden eagle lineage than to other species traditionally included in the genus Aquila.

Other largish Aquila species, the eastern imperial eagle (A. heliaca), the Spanish imperial eagle (A. adaberti), the tawny eagle (A. rapax) and the steppe eagles (A. nipalensis), are now thought to be separate, close-knit clade, which attained some similar characteristics to the golden eagle clade via convergent evolution.

== Spotted eagles ==
Genetically, the "spotted eagles" (Clanga pomarina, C. hasata & C. clanga), have been discovered to be more closely related to the long-crested eagle (Lophaetus occipitalis) and the black eagle (Ictinaetus malaiensis), and many generic reassignments have been advocated.

== Hieratites ==
The genus Hieraaetus, including the booted eagle (H. pennatus), little eagle (H. morphnoides) and Ayres's hawk-eagle (H. ayresii), consists of much smaller species, that are in fact the smallest birds called eagles outside of the unrelated Spilornis serpent-eagle genus. This genus has recently been eliminated by some authorities and its members included in Aquila, although not all ornithological unions have followed this suit in this re-classification. The small-bodied Wahlberg's eagle (H. wahlbergi) has been traditionally considered an Aquila species due to its lack of change from juvenile to adult plumage and brownish color, but it is genetically aligned to the Hieraaetus lineage. Cassin's hawk-eagle (H. africanus) is also probably closely related to the Hieraaetus group rather than the Spizaetus/Nisaetus "hawk-eagle" group (in which it was previously classified) which is not known to have radiated to Africa.
