= David P. Mindell =

American ornithologist

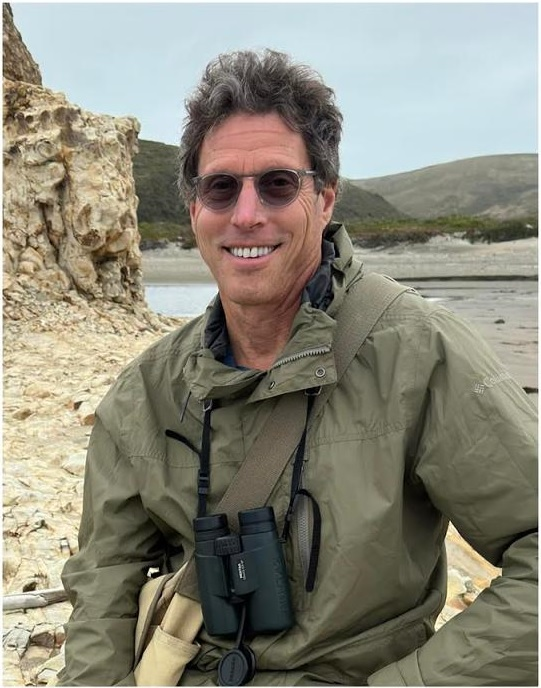
- Known for: The Evolving World: Evolution in Everyday Life
- Awards: 1986 George S. Wise Post-doctoral Fellowship, Tel Aviv University, Israel 2006 Fellow of Radcliffe Institute for Advanced Study, Harvard University; 2007 Independent Publisher Gold Medal Award, for The Evolving World 2011 Fellow of the California Academy of Sciences, San Francisco

Academic background
- Education: Prescott College; Brigham Young University

Academic work
- Discipline: Ornithology, evolutionary biology
- Institutions: University of California, Berkeley
- Website: davidpmindell.wordpress.com

David P. Mindell is an American evolutionary biologist and author. He is currently a senior researcher at the University of California, Berkeley, Museum of Vertebrate Zoology. Mindell's work is focused on the systematics, conservation and molecular evolution of birds, especially birds of prey. He is known for his 2006 book, The Evolving World in which he explained, for the general public, how evolution applies to everyday life.

From 1994 to 2008 Mindell was Professor of ecology and evolutionary biology and Curator of birds at the University of Michigan. He served as dean of science and Harry & Diana Hind Chair at the California Academy of Sciences between 2008 and 2011, and was Program Director in the Division of Environmental Biology at the US National Science Foundation during 2012 to 2016.

== Biography ==
Mindell was born in Buffalo, New York, where he attended Nichols School. He received a B.S. degree from Prescott College in 1975, and a Ph.D. degree from Brigham Young University in 1986. He was a post-doctoral fellow at Harvard University between 1987 and 1989, after which he joined the University of Cincinnati as an assistant professor.

In 1994, Mindell joined the University of Michigan where he taught evolutionary biology and served as professor and curator of birds. In 1998, he was appointed as the director of Genomic Diversity Laboratory at the Museum of Zoology, and in 2003, he was appointed the director of Museum of Zoology. In 2006, he was awarded the Radcliffe Fellowship at Harvard University, where he conducted research on variable rates of evolutionary change across genes and organisms.

He was elected to serve as the president of Society of Systematic Biology in 2011.

Mindell has held many fellowships, including the George S. Wise post-doctoral fellowship at Tel Aviv University (1986), a fellowship with the Radcliffe Institute for Advanced Study (2006), and another with California Academy of Sciences (2011). In 2007, he received the Independent Publisher Gold Medal Award for The Evolving World.

== Research ==
Mindell's research focuses on evolutionary biology, and specifically the evolution and molecular systematics of birds. He has conducted comprehensive analyses of the systematics of diurnal birds of prey (hawks, eagles, falcons, vultures) in the orders Accipitriformes, Falconiformes and Cathartiformes. His work, funded by both U.S. National Science Foundation and The Peregrine Fund, includes assessment of the genetic distinctiveness and diversity of many poorly known groups of diurnal raptors, and resolution of taxonomic uncertainties.

== Publications ==
=== Selected articles ===
- Mindell, D P; Honeycutt, R L (November 1990). "Ribosomal RNA in Vertebrates: Evolution and Phylogenetic Applications". Annual Review of Ecology and Systematics. 21 (1): 541–566. Bibcode:1990AnRES..21..541M. doi:10.1146/annurev.es.21.110190.002545. ISSN 0066-4162.
- Knight, Alec; Mindell, David P. (March 1, 1993). "Substitution Bias, Weighting of DNA Sequence Evolution, and the Phylogenetic Position of Fea's Viper". Systematic Biology. 42 (1): 18–31. doi:10.1093/sysbio/42.1.18. ISSN 1063-5157.
- Mindell, David P.; Sorenson, Michael D.; Dimcheff, Derek E. (September 1998). "Multiple independent origins of mitochondrial gene order in birds". Proceedings of the National Academy of Sciences. 95 (18). Proceedings of the National Academy of Sciences: 10693–10697. doi:10.1073/pnas.95.18.10693. PMC 27957. PMID 9724766.
- Mindell, David P.; Sorenson, Michael D.; Dimcheff, Derek E.; Hasegawa, Masami; Ast, Jennifer C.; Yuri, Tamaki (March 1999). "Interordinal Relationships of Birds and Other Reptiles Based on Whole Mitochondrial Genomes". Systematic Biology. 48 (1): 138–152. doi:10.1080/106351599260490. PMID 12078637.
- Sorenson, Michael D.; Ast, Jennifer C.; Dimcheff, Derek E.; Yuri, Tamaki; Mindell, David P. (July 1, 1999). "Primers for a PCR-Based Approach to Mitochondrial Genome Sequencing in Birds and Other Vertebrates". Molecular Phylogenetics and Evolution. 12 (2): 105–114. Bibcode:1999MolPE..12..105S. doi:10.1006/mpev.1998.0602. ISSN 1055-7903. PMID 10381314.
- Mindell, David P.; Meyer, Axel (August 1, 2001). "Homology evolving". Trends in Ecology & Evolution. 16 (8): 434–440. Bibcode:2001TEcoE..16..434M. doi:10.1016/S0169-5347(01)02206-6. ISSN 0169-5347.
- Cracraft, J.; Barker, F. K.; Braun, M.; Harshman, J.; Dyke, Gareth J.; Feinstein, J.; Stanley, S.; Cibois, A.; Schikle, P.; Beresford, P.; García-Moreno, J.; Sorenson, M. D.; Yuri, T.; Mindell, D. P. (August 12, 2004). Phylogenetic relationships among modern birds (Neornithes): towards an avian tree of life. Oxford University Press. pp. 468–489. ISBN 978-0-19-517234-8.
- Brown, Joseph W.; Rest, Joshua S.; García-Moreno, Jaime; Sorenson, Michael D.; Mindell, David P. (January 28, 2008). "Strong mitochondrial DNA support for a Cretaceous origin of modern avian lineages". BMC Biology. 6: 6. doi:10.1186/1741-7007-6-6. PMC 2267772. PMID 18226223.
- Barnosky, Anthony D.; Hadly, Elizabeth A.; Bascompte, Jordi; Berlow, Eric L.; Brown, James H.; Fortelius, Mikael; Getz, Wayne M.; Harte, John; Hastings, Alan; Marquet, Pablo A.; Martinez, Neo D.; Mooers, Arne; Roopnarine, Peter; Vermeij, Geerat; Williams, John W.; Gillespie, Rosemary; Kitzes, Justin; Marshall, Charles; Matzke, Nicholas; Mindell, David P.; Revilla, Eloy; Smith, Adam B. (June 2012). "Approaching a state shift in Earth's biosphere". Nature. 486 (7401): 52–58. Bibcode:2012Natur.486...52B. doi:10.1038/nature11018. hdl:10261/55208. ISSN 1476-4687. PMID 22678279. S2CID 4788164.
- Mindell, David P. (May 2013). "The Tree of Life: Metaphor, Model, and Heuristic Device". Systematic Biology. 62 (3): 479–489. doi:10.1093/sysbio/sys115. PMID 23291311.
- Jarvis, Erich D.; et al. (December 12, 2014). "Whole-genome analyses resolve early branches in the tree of life of modern birds". Science. 346 (6215): 1320–1331. Bibcode:2014Sci...346.1320J. doi:10.1126/science.1253451. ISSN 0036-8075. PMC 4405904. PMID 25504713. S2CID 52818555.
- Zhang, Guojie; et al. (December 12, 2014). "Comparative genomics reveals insights into avian genome evolution and adaptation". Science. 346 (6215): 1311–1320. Bibcode:2014Sci...346.1311Z. doi:10.1126/science.1251385. ISSN 0036-8075. PMC 4390078. PMID 25504712. S2CID 14410644.
- Fuchs, Jérôme; Johnson, Jeff A.; Mindell, David P. (January 1, 2015). "Rapid diversification of falcons (Aves: Falconidae) due to expansion of open habitats in the Late Miocene". Molecular Phylogenetics and Evolution. 82: 166–182. Bibcode:2015MolPE..82..166F. doi:10.1016/j.ympev.2014.08.010. ISSN 1055-7903. PMID 25256056.
- Mindell, David P.; Fuchs, Jérôme; Johnson, Jeff A. (2018). "Phylogeny, Taxonomy, and Geographic Diversity of Diurnal Raptors: Falconiformes, Accipitriformes, and Cathartiformes". Birds of Prey: Biology and Conservation in the XXI Century. Springer International Publishing. pp. 3–32. doi:10.1007/978-3-319-73745-4_1. ISBN 978-3-319-73744-7.
- Robinson, Jacqueline A.; Bowie, Rauri C. K.; Dudchenko, Olga; Aiden, Erez Lieberman; Hendrickson, Sher L.; Steiner, Cynthia C.; Ryder, Oliver A.; Mindell, David P.; Wall, Jeffrey D. (July 12, 2021). "Genome-wide diversity in the California condor tracks its prehistoric abundance and decline". Current Biology. 31 (13): 2939–2946.e5. Bibcode:2021CBio...31E2939R. doi:10.1016/j.cub.2021.04.035. ISSN 1879-0445. PMID 33989525. S2CID 234597144.

=== Books ===
- Mindell, David P., ed. (1997). Avian molecular evolution and systematics. San Diego: Academic Press. ISBN 978-0-12-498315-1.
- Mindell, David P. (October 15, 2007). The Evolving World: Evolution in Everyday Life. Harvard University Press. ISBN 978-0-674-02558-5. OCLC 165408267.
- Scheiner, Samuel M.; Mindell, David P., eds. (2020). The theory of evolution: principles, concepts, and assumptions. Chicago: The University of Chicago Press. ISBN 978-0-226-67102-4.
- Mindell, David P. (2024). The network of life: a new view of evolution. Princeton, New Jersey: Princeton University Press. ISBN 978-0-691-22877-8.
