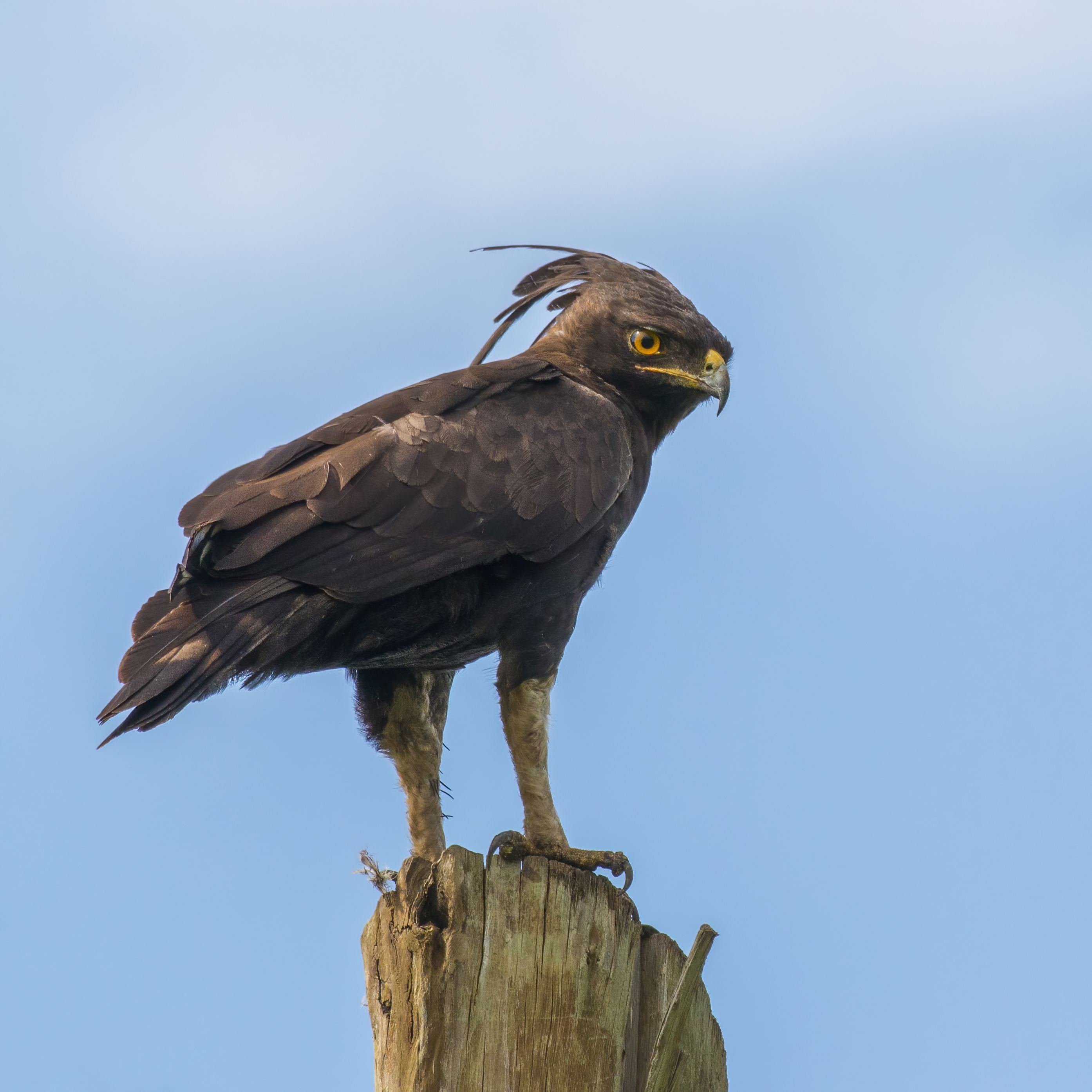
- In Queen Elizabeth NP, Uganda

Conservation status
- Least Concern (IUCN 3.1)

Scientific classification
- Kingdom: Animalia
- Phylum: Chordata
- Class: Aves
- Order: Accipitriformes
- Family: Accipitridae
- Genus: Lophaetus; Kaup, 1847
- Species: L. occipitalis

Binomial name
- Lophaetus occipitalis (Daudin, 1800)
- IUCN range Extant (resident)

Synonyms
- Falco occipitalis Daudin, 1800

= Long-crested eagle =

Species of bird of prey

The long-crested eagle (Lophaetus occipitalis) is an African bird of prey characterised by its shaggy crest of feathers. In the family Accipitridae which includes all the eagles, it is currently placed in a monotypic genus Lophaetus. It is found throughout mid- and southern Africa, with differing home ranges due to food availability and suitable habitat area, but lives mainly on forest edges and near moist areas. Breeding may occur at any time of year, depending on food availability; it lays 1 or 2 eggs as is usual for raptors. It commonly eats smaller mammals, but will also eat other vertebrates and invertebrates.

== Description ==
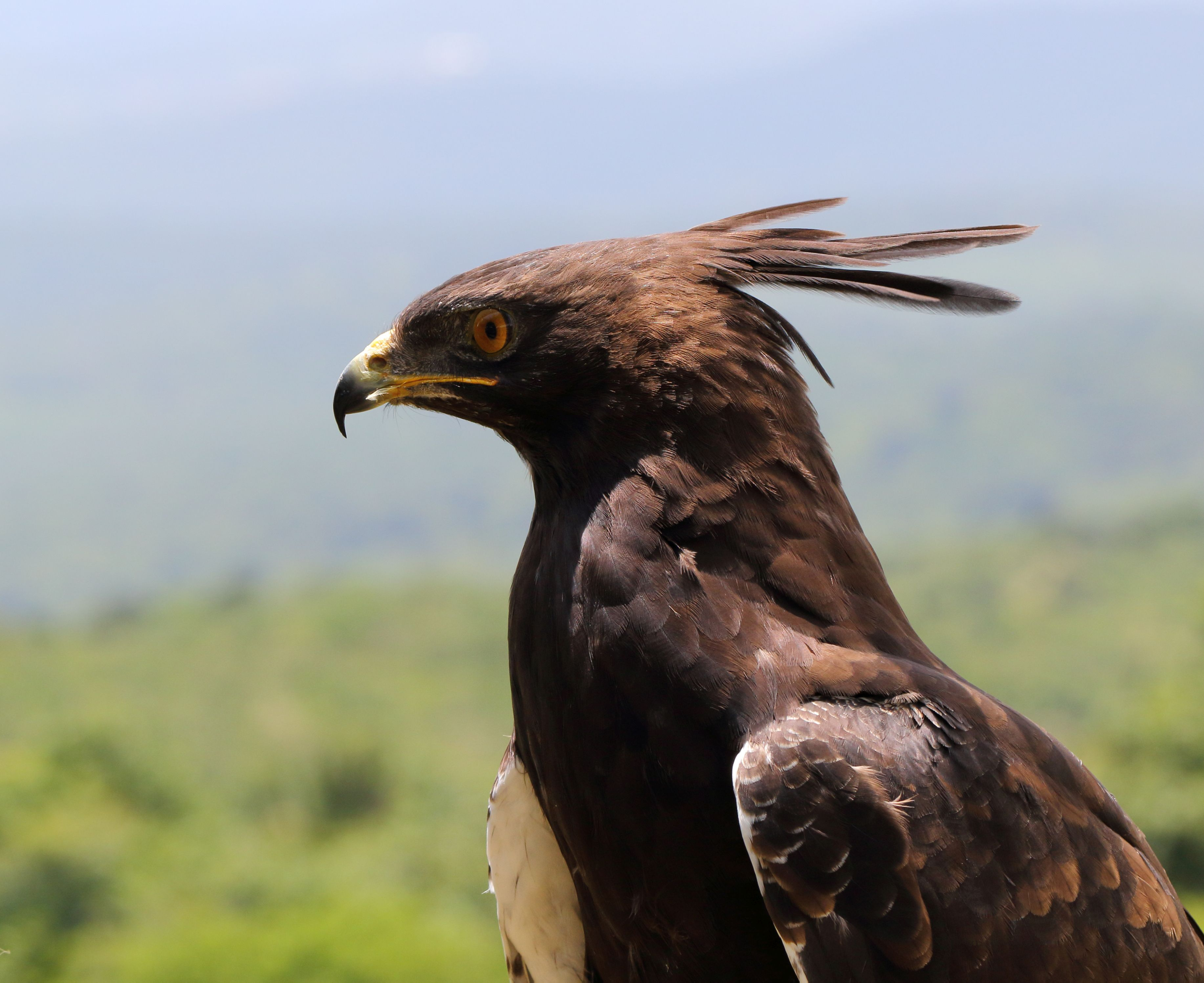
A captive bird in South Africa

The long-crested eagle is a distinctive eagle when perched due to the long, shaggy crest and all dark plumage often called Kamusungu-sungu in Uganda. The adults are blackish-brown with long, thin feathers growing from the rear of the crown which are held erect to form a crest. The secondary feathers are black barred with light grey and with broad black tips, the primary feathers and median underwing coverts are white, forming a noticeable white patch on the upper and lower surfaces of the wing which is visible in flight. The tail is black, barred with pale grey. The eyes of adults are bright yellow but can be darker in females, and the cere and feet are yellow, paling to white in males. The juveniles are similar to the adults, but the plumage is lighter in colour and the crest is not developed and their eyes are grey. The body length is 53–58 cm (21–23 in) and the weight of the female is 1,300–1,500 g (46–53 oz), while the smaller male is 912–1,300 g (32.2–45.9 oz).

== Distribution ==
The long-crested eagle occurs in sub-Saharan Africa from Senegal and Gambia eastwards to Ethiopia and south to the Eastern Cape, in South Africa, northern Namibia and northern Botswana. It is generally regarded as sedentary, but in arid areas may be nomadic depending on the rains.

== Habitat ==
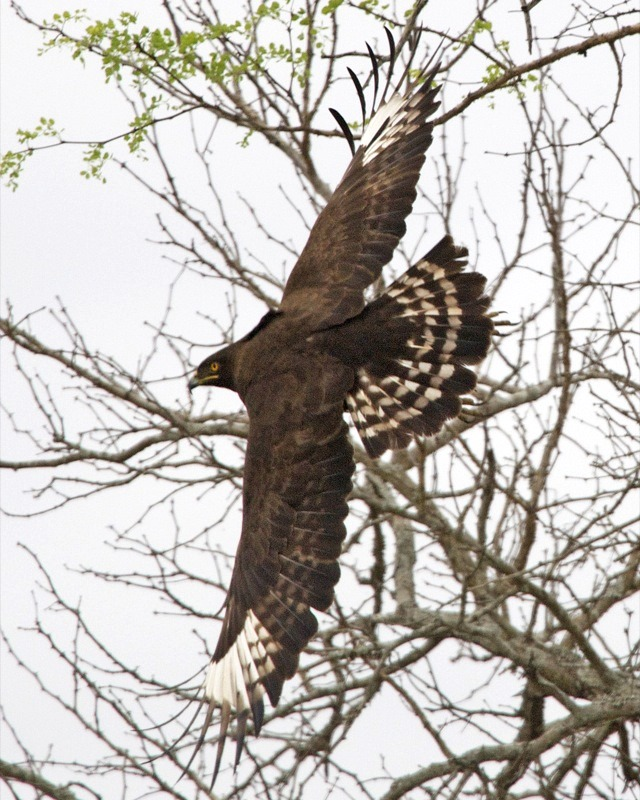
In flight in a game park in South Africa

The long-crested eagle is a bird of forest edges and moist woodland, particularly if that habitat is near to grassland, marsh, a river or a stream; it can also be found in drier woodland, mixed farmland, grazing land, the edges of sugar-cane plantations and orchards. Long-crested eagles will also use exotic plantations such as those of pine or eucalyptus. They range in altitude from sea level to 3,000 m (9,800 ft), but it is unusual to find them above 2,000 m (6,600 ft).

=== Home ranges ===
The home ranges in KwaZulu-Natal (KZN) in South Africa of male long-crested eagles is between 0.56 and 11.6 square kilometres (0.22 and 4.48 sq mi) and the home range of females is 0.5 to 15.08 square kilometres (0.19 to 5.82 sq mi). Some individuals in KZN were observed to be 20 km away from the centre of their home range. In the Mpumalanga province, the home range has been reported to be between 25 and 35 square kilometres (9.7 and 13.5 sq mi). Long-crested eagles in Zimbabwe have been studied to have a home range of 40 to 65 km^{2} (15 to 25 sq mi). Finally, within these home range sizes, the mean distance travelled in a study by Maphalala et al. was about 2 km (1.2 mi) due to their sit and wait approach discussed in the food section below.

== Behaviour ==
=== Breeding ===
The long-crested eagle is territorial. The male displays during courtship, in which he performs steep dives and also uses a rocking, level display flight. They call frequently during these displays. Both sexes build the nest, constructing a stick platform with a bowl-shaped depression in the centre, which is lined with green leaves. The nest is normally situated in the mid-canopy and very close to the trunk of a tree near the forest edge. If available, the long-crested eagle will often reuse the nest of another bird, for example, the black sparrowhawk or lizard buzzard. It breeds all year, but most eggs are laid in July–November. The female lays 1–2 eggs, and she takes most of the burden of incubating them, incubation lasting 42 days. As she incubates, the male provides her with food. As is normal in birds of prey the eggs are laid asynchronously, as much as two weeks apart, and the female begins incubation as soon as the first egg is laid which means that hatching is also asynchronous. When the young hatch, they are initially mainly fed by the male. The period from hatching to fledging is about 53 days, and the juveniles remain dependent on the adults for about a further 2–3 months. The nests have been recorded as being preyed upon by monkeys Cercopithecus spp and genets.

Long-crested eagles breed throughout the year if enough food is available. Though they maintain their nesting territories throughout the year, females have been shown to leave the territory during the non-breeding season. Furthermore, home ranges during the breeding season have been observed to be smaller, and to expand during the non-breeding season. Females forage closer to their chicks and travel farther to find their meals as the chicks grow and can fend for themselves. There are potential competitors for the long-crested eagles nest including black sparrowhawks and Egyptian geese. Nesting space itself is also competed for by other raptorial species, including black kites, Wahlberg's eagle, jackal buzzards, and African harrier-hawks.

=== Food ===
Rodents are up to 98% of the long-crested eagle's diet. In southern Africa the rodents taken include greater cane rat (Thryonomys swinderianus), vlei rats Otomys spp., African marsh rat (Dasmys incomtus) and four-striped grass mouse (Rhabdomys pumilio). Birds, including owls and the young of other raptors, frogs and lizards, invertebrates and even fish and fruit are also recorded as forming part of its diet.

The long-crested eagle is a "sit and wait" hunter which scans the ground from a perch and swoops on prey with a gliding flight.

== Taxonomic notes ==
Although it is currently in the monotypic genus Lophaetus, recent research has suggested that this species forms a clade with the spotted eagles, greater spotted eagle (Clanga clanga), Indian spotted eagle (Clanga hastata) and lesser spotted eagle (Clanga pomarina). The merged genus would be called Lophaetus. However, most authorities believe that re-classification of the booted eagles requires further work, and currently retain the long-crested eagle in the monotypic Lophaetus. The lineage of Lophaetus is thought to have diversified in a period between 5 and 7 million years ago.

== Conservation ==
The population is estimated to be in the tens of thousands and expected to increase. New areas of suitable habitat are being made for rodents due to habitat fragmentation, increasing the eagle's main food source. Although the long-crested eagle is listed as least concern according to the IUCN Red List, the species still encounters threats. These include habitat fragmentation and loss, poisoning, and accidents with power lines or vehicles. A more recent threat to the long-crested eagle is an increase in the number of doves due to feeding by humans. The doves carry trichomoniasis (also called canker), which spreads quickly in dove populations. Predation of the doves by these eagles is becoming increasingly common, and trichomoniasis in the eagles causes major damage to the crop, pharynx, and mouth; as the damage progresses they become unable to eat.
