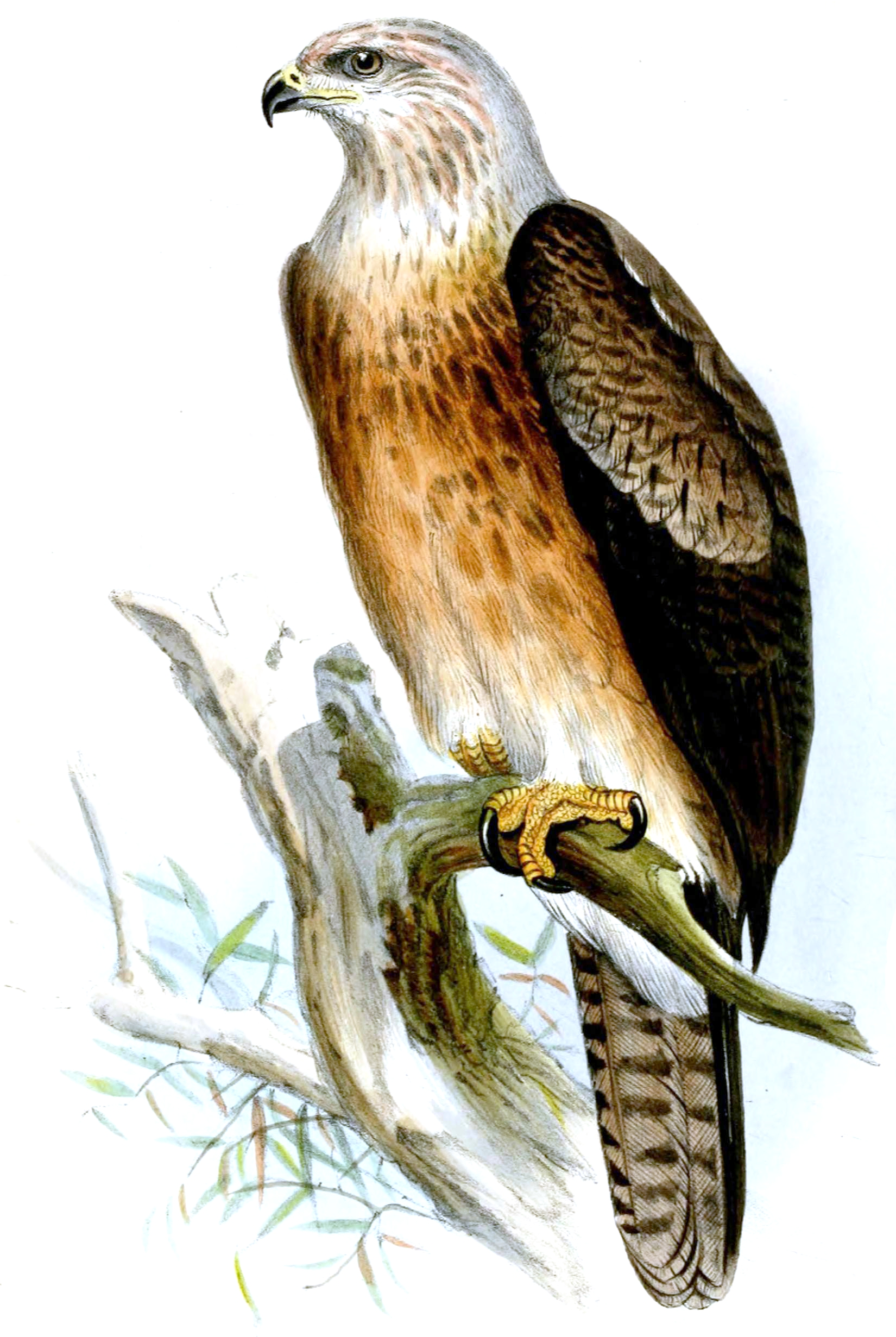

Conservation status
- Near Threatened (IUCN 3.1)

Scientific classification
- Kingdom: Animalia
- Phylum: Chordata
- Class: Aves
- Order: Accipitriformes
- Family: Accipitridae
- Genus: Aquila
- Species: A. gurneyi

Binomial name
- Aquila gurneyi Gray, GR, 1861

= Gurney's eagle =

Species of bird

Gurney's eagle (Aquila gurneyi) is a large eagle in the family Accipitridae. It is found in New Guinea and Wallacea, and is an occasional vagrant to Australia.

The common name and Latin binomial commemorate the British banker and amateur ornithologist John Henry Gurney (1819–1890).

== Description ==
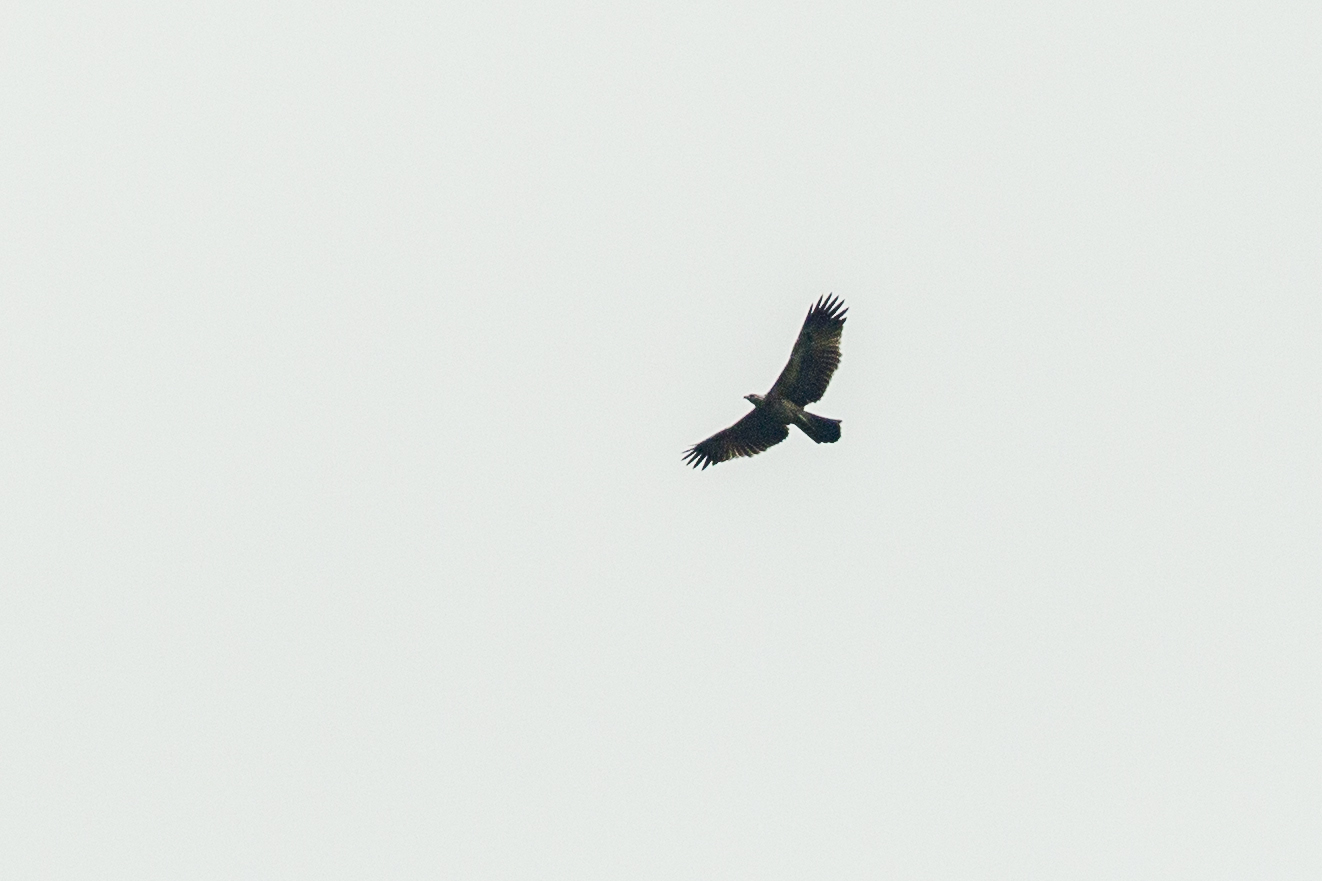
Gurney's eagle, immature or subadult.

This eagle is a fairly large species, though mid-sized as a member of the genus Aquila. It is mainly dark brown to black, with paler undersides to its flight feathers and a rounded tail. Its body length is 74–86 cm (29–34 in) with a wingspan of between 1.65 and 1.9 m (5 ft 5 in and 6 ft 3 in). Females are larger than males. One immature female weighed 3.06 kg (6.7 lb). Males are estimated to weigh about 2.21 kg (4.9 lb) in this species. Its wings are held level when gliding. It feeds on mammals (such as cuscuses), reptiles, fish, and birds.

Juveniles have brown scapular feathers, wing coverts, and back, mottled with gray and buff. The black tail is faintly barred, and the head and underparts are light brown fading into a cream-colored belly and legs.

== Range and habitat ==
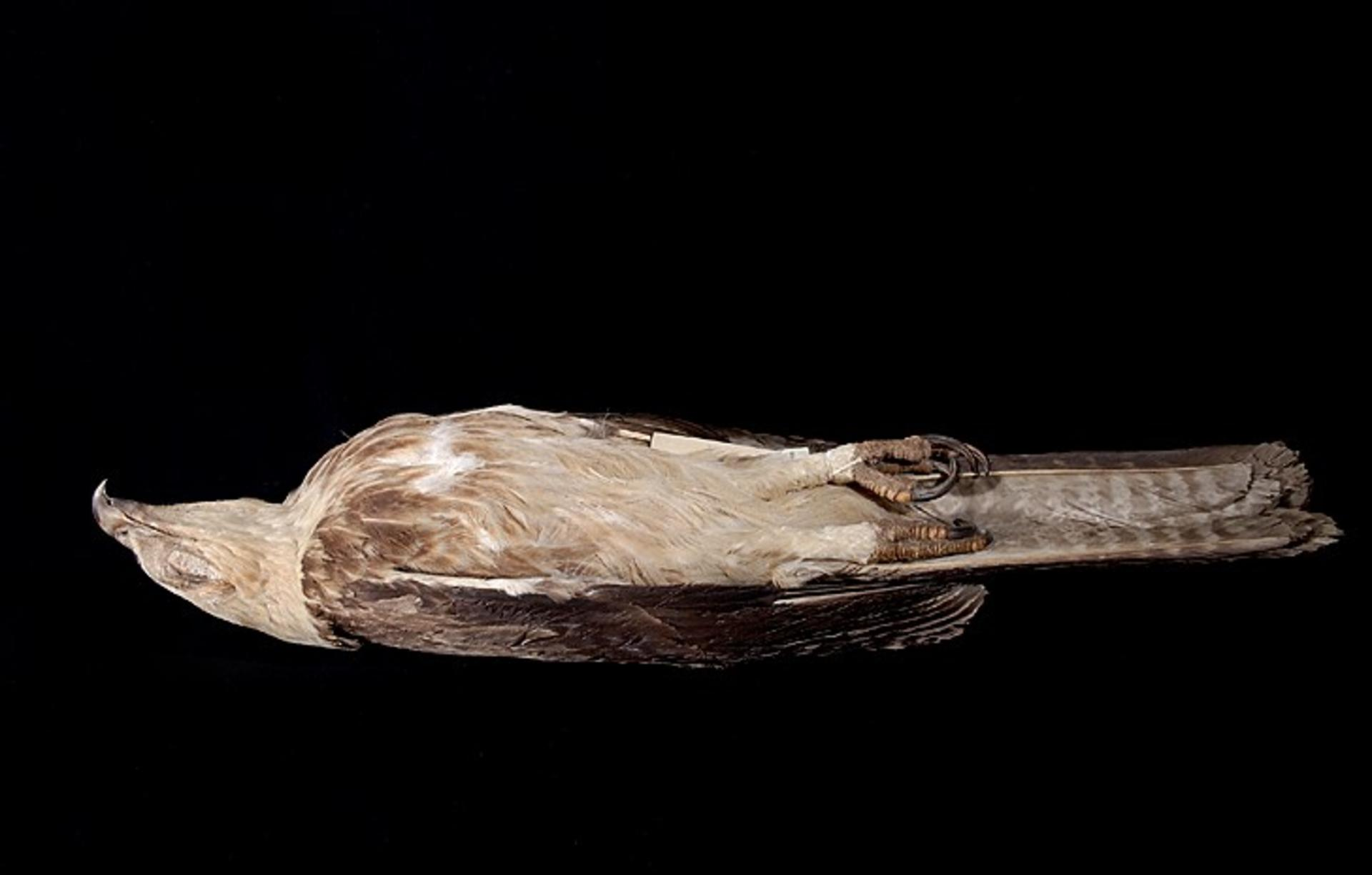
Skin of a juvenile Gurney's eagle.

Gurney's eagle is found from the Moluccas to Irian Jaya and most of New Guinea, from sea level to 1500 meters above sea level. It has been recorded from Saibai and Boigu islands in north-western Torres Strait, thus putting it on the Australian bird list. It inhabits a wide range of habitats from sea level to the snow line.

== Conservation ==
Gurney's eagle occurs at low population densities and is likely to be declining slowly through habitat loss and degradation. It is considered to be Near Threatened and is listed on CITES Appendix II.

== Works cited ==
- BirdLife International (2006). Species factsheet: Aquila gurneyi. Downloaded from http://www.birdlife.org on 9/12/2006
- Coates, B.J. (1985). The Birds of Papua New Guinea, Vol. 1, Non-Passerines. Dove: Alderley, Queensland. ISBN 0-9590257-0-7
- Morcombe, Michael (2000). Field Guide to Australian Birds. Steve Parish Publishing: Queensland. ISBN 1-876282-10-X
