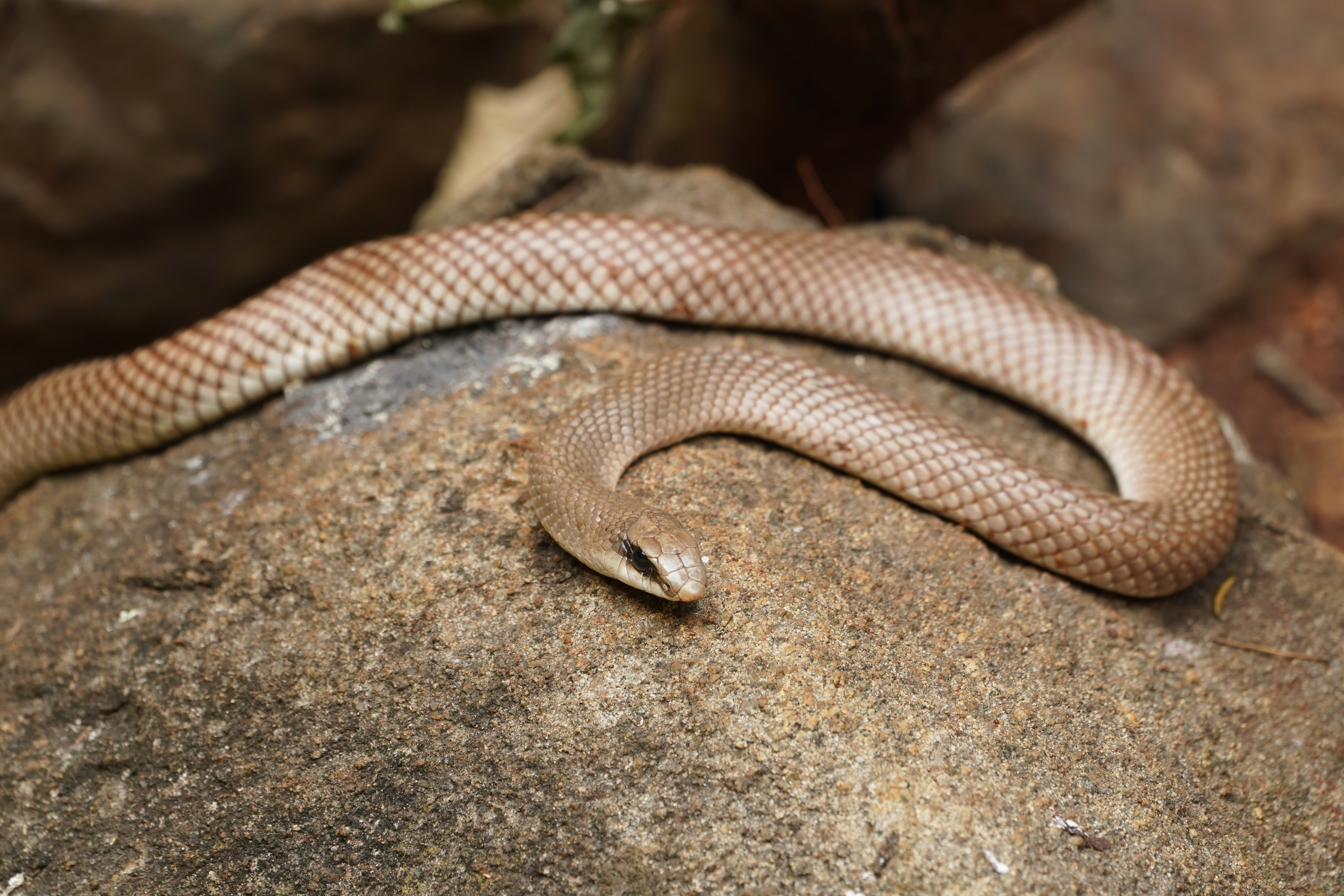
- Rhamphiophis rostratus in captivity at Nairobi Snake Park, Kenya

Conservation status
- Least Concern (IUCN 3.1)

Scientific classification
- Kingdom: Animalia
- Phylum: Chordata
- Class: Reptilia
- Order: Squamata
- Suborder: Serpentes
- Family: Psammophiidae
- Genus: Rhamphiophis
- Species: R. rostratus

Binomial name
- Rhamphiophis rostratus Peters, 1854

Synonyms
- Rhagerrhis unguiculata Günther, 1868; Coelopeltis porrectus Jan, 1870

= Rhamphiophis rostratus =

Species of snake native to east Africa

Rhamphiophis rostratus, commonly known as the rufous beaked snake, is a species of snake in the family Psammophiidae. It is a large diurnal species native to eastern Africa, ranging from Somalia and Ethiopia in the north to South Africa in the south. It is easily identified by its pointed snout and a dark stripe running through the eye.

== Taxonomy and history ==
Rhamphiophis rostratus was described in 1854 by German naturalist Wilhelm Peters based on four syntype specimens collected by Peters from Mossuril and Tete in Mozambique between June 1843 and August 1847. It is the type species of the genus Rhamphiophis, which is placed within the family Psammophiidae. Some authors consider it a subspecies of Rhamphiophis oxyrhynchus and refer to it by the trinomial name Rhamphiophis oxyrhynchus rostratus, however, molecular phylogenetic evidence supports its status as a species, with a 2008 analysis finding that R. rostratus represented a sister taxon to R. rubropunctatus and R. oxyrhynchus.

== Distribution and habitat ==
Rhamphiophis rostratus is widespread in eastern Africa, ranging from Ethiopia, Somalia, and South Sudan in the north through Kenya, Tanzania, Uganda, Mozambique, Malawi, Zambia, Zimbabwe, and Botswana, with the southernmost point of its range ending in north-eastern South Africa. A doubtful record from Eritrea is believed to be a misidentification, and it is not known from Burundi or Rwanda. It may also occur in Djibouti, but this has not been confirmed. It inhabits both dry and moist environments, including coastal thickets, woodlands, savanna, and semi-desert areas at altitudes from near sea level up to 1,700 m (5,600 ft) above sea level.

== Description ==
Rhamphiophis rostratus is a large, muscular snake with a distinctive short, downwards-pointed snout and a dark stripe running through the eye. Adults typically grow to 80 cm (31 in) to 1.2 m (3 ft 11 in) long, with the largest specimens reaching 1.6 m (5 ft 3 in). Juveniles are reddish-brown with dark speckles that fade once the snake reaches around 60–70 cm (24–28 in) in length. Body colour is variable and adults may be brown, grey, orange or pinkish above with unmarked white, cream, or yellow undersides. Darker specimens may have a pale centre to the scales, especially towards the tail, that gives a speckled appearance. It is a rear-fanged species and when threatened it is capable of flattening its neck to create a hood.

== Ecology ==
Rhamphiophis rostratus is a fast-moving and largely terrestrial diurnal species. It spends much of the day searching for prey on the ground, but is known to sometimes climb into bushes. It primarily feeds on frogs, lizards, rodents (including naked mole rats), and other snakes, but has also been reported eating beetles. It is capable of digging with its snout, breaking the soil apart with its pointed rostrum and turning its head sideways to scoop the soil out of the hole. When inactive it rests in holes, including squirrel burrows and abandoned termite nests. It is an oviparous species, laying clutches of four to twelve eggs at a time.
