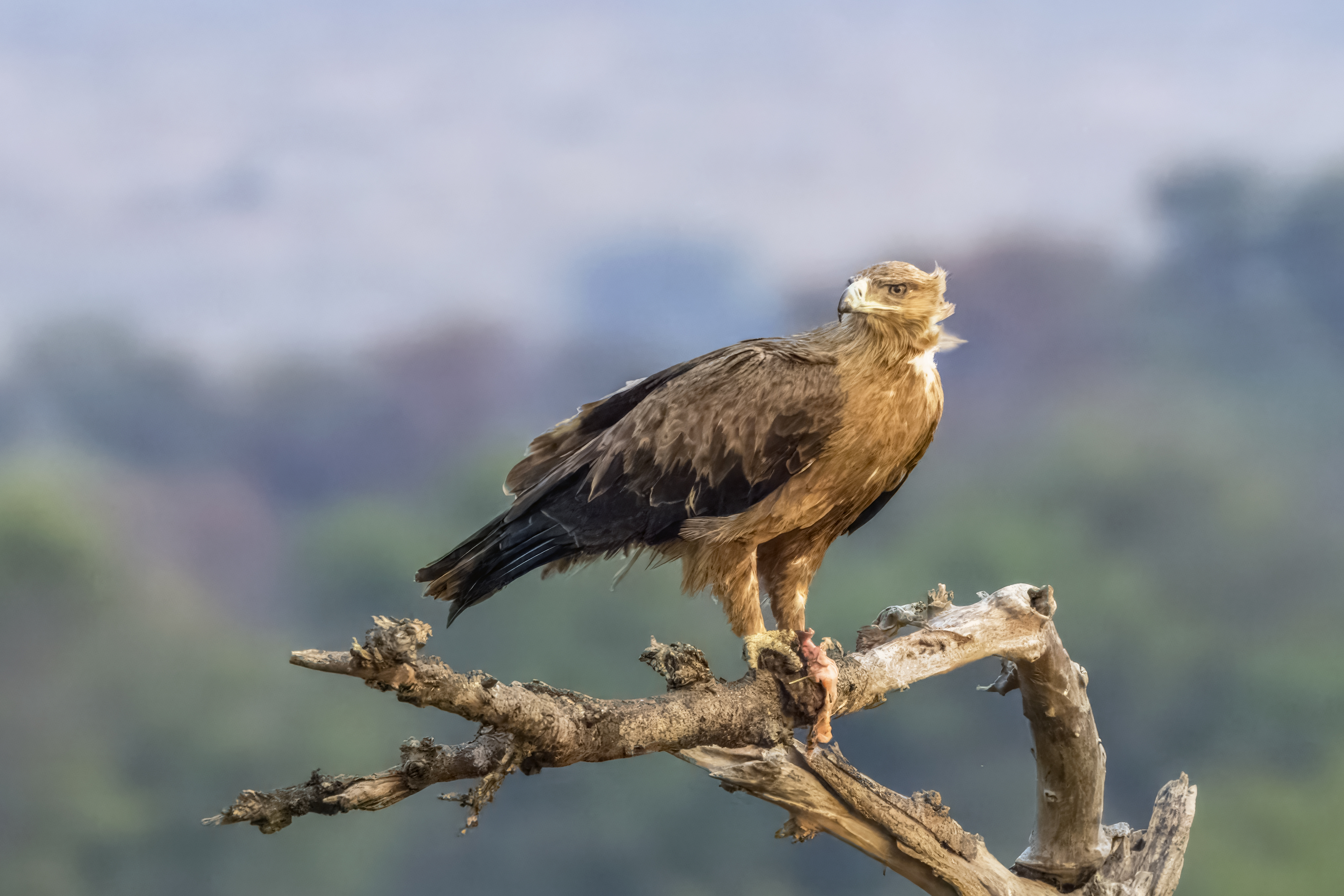
- Serengeti National Park, Tanzania

Conservation status
- Vulnerable (IUCN 3.1)

Scientific classification
- Kingdom: Animalia
- Phylum: Chordata
- Class: Aves
- Order: Accipitriformes
- Family: Accipitridae
- Genus: Aquila
- Species: A. rapax

Binomial name
- Aquila rapax (Temminck, 1828)

Subspecies
- A. r. vindhiana – Franklin, 1831; A. r. belisarius – (Levaillant, J, 1850); A. r. rapax – (Temminck, 1828)
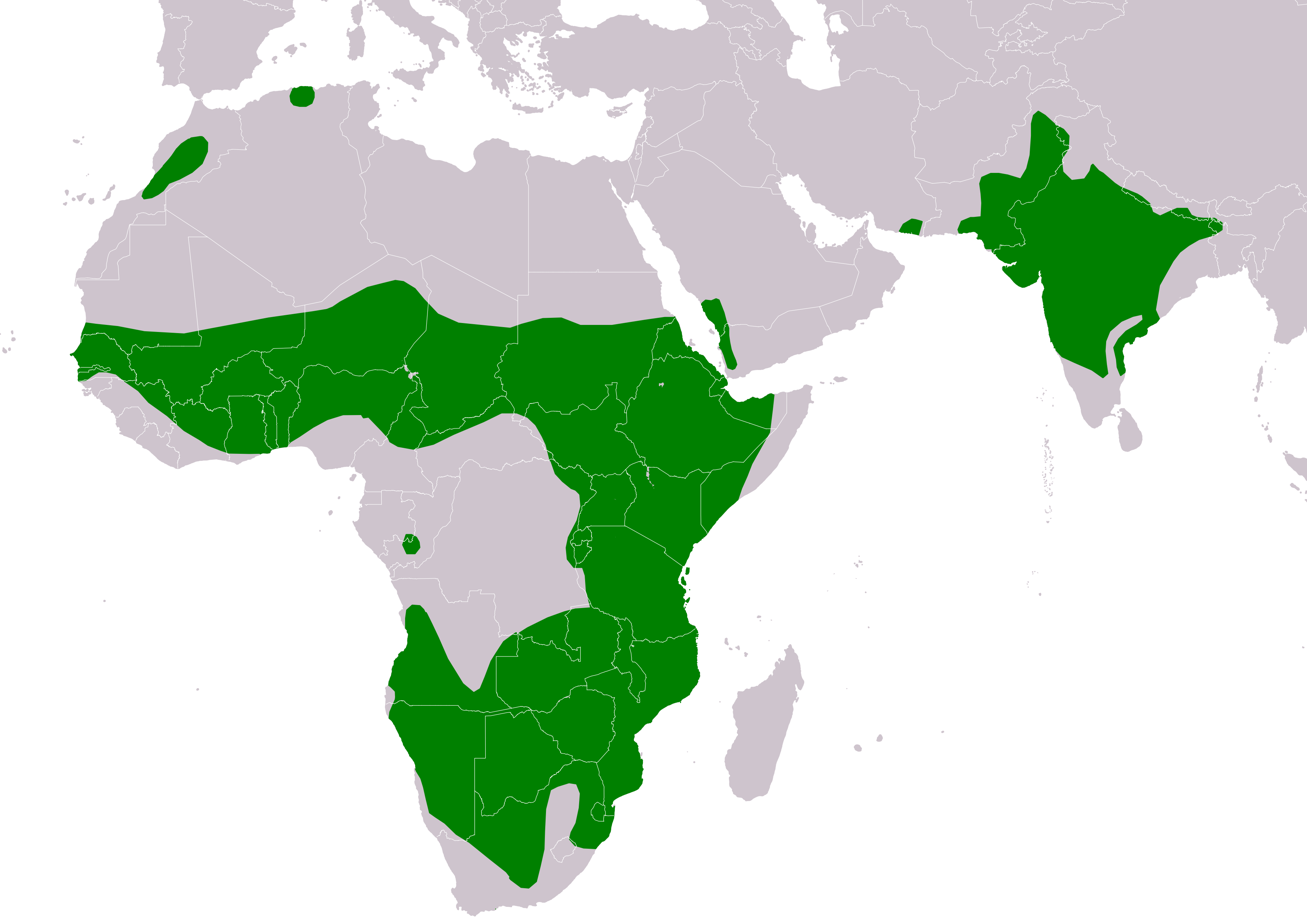
- Range of A. rapax Resident

Synonyms
- Aquila rapax rapax

= Tawny eagle =

Species of bird

The tawny eagle (Aquila rapax) is a large bird of prey. Like all eagles, it belongs to the family Accipitridae. Its heavily feathered legs mark it as a member of the subfamily Aquilinae, also known as booted eagles. Tawny eagles have an extensive but discontinuous breeding range that constitutes much of the African continent as well as the Indian subcontinent, with rare residency in the southern Middle East. Throughout its range, it favours open dry habitats such as semideserts, deserts steppes, or savanna plains. Despite its preference for arid areas, the species seldom occurs in areas where trees are entirely absent. It is a resident breeder which lays one to three eggs in a stick nest most commonly in the crown of a tree. The tawny eagle is perhaps the most highly opportunistic of all Aquilinae, and often scavenges on carrion or engages in kleptoparasitism towards other carnivorous animals but is also a bold and active predator, often of relatively large and diverse prey. It is estimated that tawny eagles can reach the age of 16 years old. Nonetheless, precipitous declines have been detected throughout the tawny eagle's range. Numerous factors, particularly loss of nesting habitat due to logging and global warming, as well as persecution (largely via poisoning) and other anthropogenic mortality (largely through contact with various manmade objects) are driving the once numerous tawny eagle perhaps to the brink of extinction.

It is also the national animal of Ghana.

== Taxonomy ==
Dutch naturalist Coenraad Jacob Temminck described the tawny eagle in 1828 from an Indian type specimen. "Tawny eagle" has been designated the official name by the International Ornithologists' Union (IOC). Aquila is Latin for "eagle" while rapax is also Latin for "to grasp", and relates to the word rapacious, i.e. highly predatory. The tawny eagle is a member of the booted eagle subfamily (Aquilinae) within the Accipitridae family. The booted eagle clan are monophyletic and study of karyotypes has indicated that they likely have few to no close external relations within the overall extant accipitrid family. The booted eagle subfamily all have feathers covering their legs and are distributed in every continent that contains accipitrids. The genus Aquila has been traditionally defined as largish, dark-hued and long-winged eagles of open country. However, study of genetics have resulted in several reclassifications. These include the moving of smaller, paler and more forest-dwelling eagles in Aquila, the separation of the unique spotted eagles to the genus Clanga as well as the division of some small eagles to the genus Hieraeetus outside of Aquila. Furthermore, genetic research has further revealed a schism in superficially similar eagles between the tawny eagle and its close relatives and other superficially similar Aquila such as the golden eagle (Aquila chrysaetos) species complex. To date, the tawny eagle species group and golden eagle species group are still contained in the same genus despite the apparent lack of close relation.

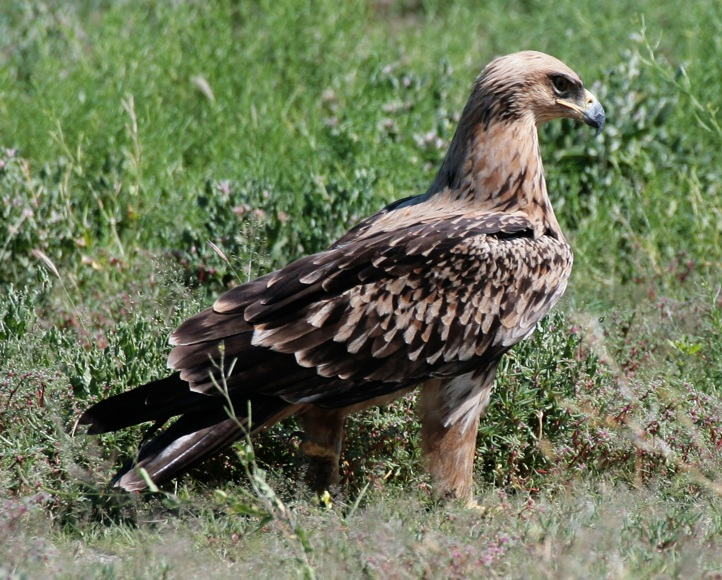
A tawny eagle sitting on the ground displaying typical features: a mid-sized eagle with a long neck, well-feathered legs, well-proportioned frame and large bill lacking a deep gape.

The tawny eagle was previously treated as conspecific with the migratory steppe eagle (Aquila nipalensis). These eagles were considered part of the same species as recently as 1991. The steppe and tawny eagles were split based on pronounced differences in morphology and anatomy. The steppe eagle is a larger bird, with a much more pronounced gape, and differs by appearance in its blockier frame, bigger wings and evinces different coloring at all stages of development, despite some morphs of the two eagles superficially resembling one another. Furthermore, the respective species differ in ecology (dietary biology, nesting habits) and are strongly allopatric in their breeding ground distribution. Two molecular studies, each based on a very small number of genes, indicate that the species are distinct, but disagree over how closely related they are. Genetically, the tawny eagle may cluster more closely with the imperial eagle species complex despite the steppe eagle being more sympatric with those northerly Eurasian eagles.

=== Subspecies ===
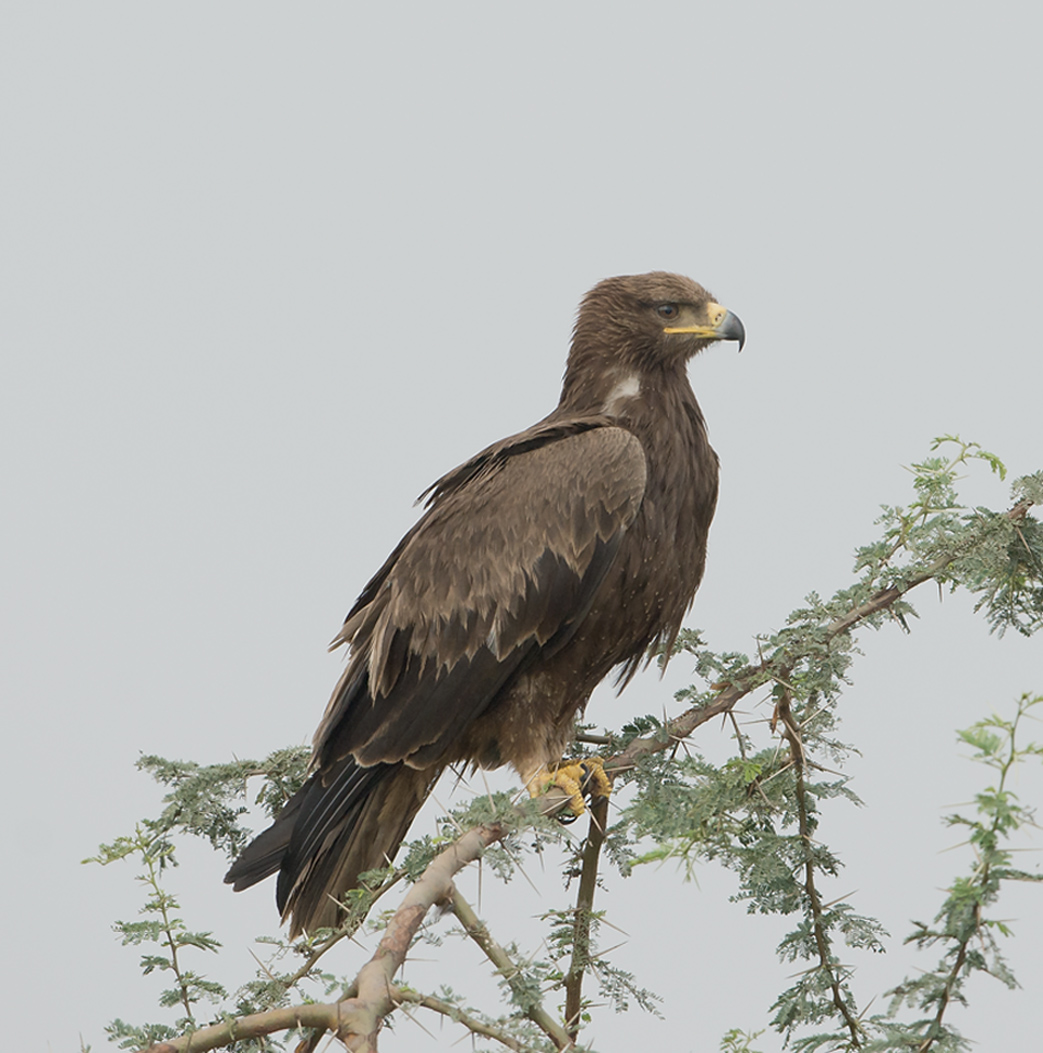
The distinctly darker subspecies native to India and elsewhere in Asia, A. r. vindhiana.

There are three described races of tawny eagles. The subspecific classification of the species has at times been considered complicated by variations and existence of different morphs; in turn they were once considered tentative. However, each subspecies is largely allopatric in geography, the primary ambiguities lying in the northern part of east Africa where both African races may intergrade.

- A. r. rapax; distributed in Africa from the southern Democratic Republic of the Congo and central Kenya to all points southwards. However, this race may range up to as far north as Ethiopia as well (thus likely intergrading considerably with the following subspecies which is widespread in Ethiopia). Adult often of this nominate subspecies are often relatively more strongly rufous in colour than other races and are sometimes dark streaked below. Meanwhile, the juvenile tends to be light rufous. wing chord lengths in this race have been measured at 485 to 540 mm (19.1 to 21.3 in) in males and 509 to 565 mm (20.0 to 22.2 in) in females. The mean wing chord length in two samples of A. r. rapax measured 501 and 512 mm (19.7 and 20.2 in) in males and 541 and 545 mm (21.3 and 21.5 in) in females. The tail length of both sexes in A. r. rapax measures 245 to 295 mm (9.6 to 11.6 in) with a tarsus length of 79 to 92 mm (3.1 to 3.6 in). Body mass can range roughly from 1.6 to 3.1 kg (3.5 to 6.8 lb) in overall samples of at least 36 eagles.
- A. r. belisarius; this race resides in west Africa to Ethiopia and southwest Arabia as well as far south as the northern Democratic Republic of the Congo and northern Kenya. This race is described to appear "neater" than the nominate subspecies, possibly due to this race often occurring in even more desert-like conditions than the other races and thus having more compact feathering. It is when compared to the nominate, often duller and browner above, showing less of a rufous tinge. Meanwhile, individual pale morph of A. r. belisarius often a shade or two darker than pale nominate but not consistently so. Although said to be slightly larger, measurement data shows this subspecies to of broadly very similar size to the nominate race. In males, the wing chord is 495 to 535 mm (19.5 to 21.1 in) and, in females, the wing chord is 500 to 562 mm (19.7 to 22.1 in). The mean wing chord lengths were reportedly 515 mm (20.3 in) in males and 525 mm (20.7 in), which indicates a slightly less pronounced sexual dimorphism than in the nominate race. As for body mass, 1 male was found to weigh 2 kg (4.4 lb) while three females weighed from 1.9 to 2.5 kg (4.2 to 5.5 lb).
- A. r. vindhiana; excluding the Arabian Peninsula, this race likely comprises all the tawny eagles found in Asia, such as in southeastern Iran and the Indian subcontinent. However, ambiguities exists on where the range of A. r. belisarius ends and of vindhiana begins, especially in Middle Eastern areas. Sometimes A. r. vindhiana is suggested as full species. This subspecies averages darker than either other race and usually is lacking in warmer rufous tone. In general, it is somewhat more similar in hue to the steppe eagle. Adult irises are sometimes brown in A. r. vindhiana (again reminiscent of the steppe eagle). The pale morph of this race is greyer and less rufous than African tawny eagles, although generally juveniles and immature are sometimes more rufous. It may be marginally the smallest subspecies, although in general the tawny eagle evinces remarkably little size variation across its wide range. Wing chord measurements are 473 to 535 mm (18.6 to 21.1 in) in males and 510 to 560 mm (20 to 22 in). In males, the wing chord reportedly averages about 495 mm (19.5 in) and in females, it averages 525 mm (20.7 in). In males the tail length is 242 to 258 mm (9.5 to 10.2 in) and in female it is 242 to 285 mm (9.5 to 11.2 in). The tarsus length of male A. r. vindhiana is 80 to 87 mm (3.1 to 3.4 in) and in females is 84 to 91 mm (3.3 to 3.6 in). Unsexed adults in India weighed from 1.5 to 2.1 kg (3.3 to 4.6 lb).

== Description ==
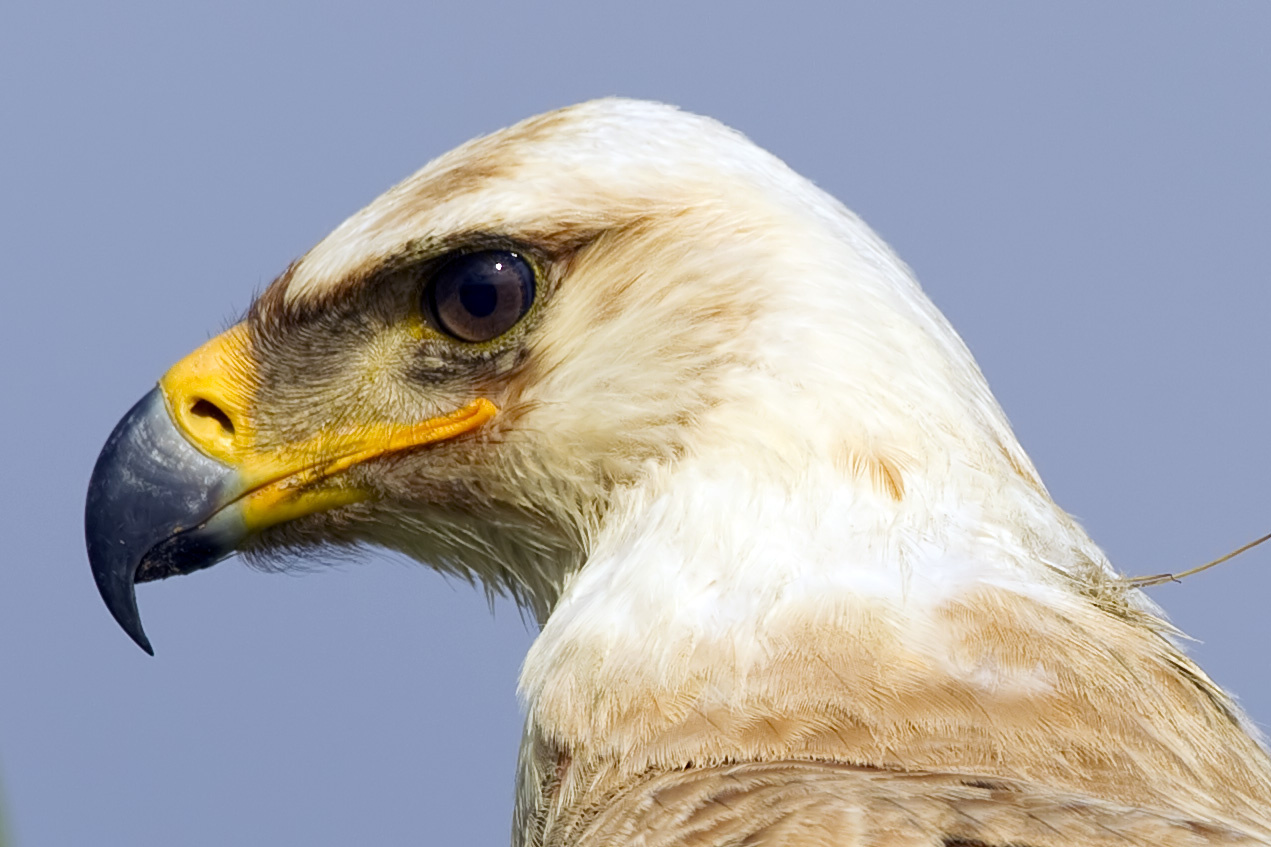
Close-up showing gape extending only to below the middle of the eye

The tawny eagle is considered to appear "inelegant, scruffy-looking" but has a fairly characteristic aquiline silhouette. The species has a fairly long neck and long deep bill with a gape line level with the eye, moderately long wings with fairly pronounced "fingers" and a slightly rounded to almost square-ended and shortish tail, which can be more reminiscent of the tail of a vulture than that of other eagles. The feathering on the legs is extensive and can appear almost baggy-looking. The bill and head are strong and bold, the body well-proportioned and feet are powerful while the countenance is quite fierce-looking. While perching, the tawny eagle tends to sit rather upright, often on stumps, posts, low trees or treetops for long periods of the day or may descend to the ground to walk somewhat unsteadily with a more horizontal posture. The wingtips when perched are roughly even with the tip of the tail. Adults have variably colored eyes, ranging from yellow to pale brown to yellow brown, while those of juveniles are dark brown. Both the cere and feet are yellow at all ages. The tawny eagle is polymorphic with considerable individual variation in plumage, resulting in occasional disparities in plumages that can engender confusion in some. In adulthood, they can vary in coloration from all dark grey-brown to an occasionally streaky (or more plain) foxy-rufous to buffish-yellow. Most adults are usually a general grey-brown or rufous-tawny color, with occasional pale spotting visible at close quarters on the nape and belly, coverts uniformly toned as the body. The nape is consistently dark and uniform despite the feathers often being tipped paler with other feathers in adults, lacking the contrasting paler feathers often seen in other Aquila. Females, in addition to being slightly larger, may tend to be slightly darker and more streaked than the males. The most blackish-brown individuals tend to occur in India. Adults often show relatively little varying colors apart from their somewhat blacker wing and tail feathers, though when freshly molted great wing coverts and secondaries may show small pale tips which may form pale lines along closed wing has tawny upper parts and blackish flight feathers and tail. The head is often similarly tawny in colour as the body but may also sometimes shows darker eyebrows, other thin brown streaks or a darker chin. Meanwhile, the tail is plain or obscurely dark barred (with around 7 subtle bands). The dark morph adult is essentially all dark, dull brown. Some dark morph tawny eagles with wear may show irregular streaking or molting browns and more blackish feathers. Intermediate morph are dark to rufous brown above with the mantle and wing coverts variably streaked or molted lighter rufous as is the head with the crown or crown-sides being paler. The intermediate morph's underside is largely rufous (especially farther south in Africa) with breast and flanks very heavily and broadly streaked dark brown, though at times appears all dark brown contrasting with plain trousers and crissum. Pale morph adult tawny eagles always show a clear contrast between the pale body and wing coverts which bear darker flight feathers and tail. In pale morphs, the underparts are rufous buff to lighty tawny-brown, phasing into somewhat darker lesser and median wing coverts to darker brown to even blackish greater coverts and flight feathers. The head may too be tawny in pale morph tawny eagles but sometimes with thin brown streaks or darker chin. Below pale morph adults are all light rufous to tawny buff or brown, sometimes paler below the belly area. In worn individuals the bodily feathers of pale morph tawny eagles can appear almost whitish. Dark morph juvenile tawny eagles are generally light rufous to rufous brown with creamier lower back to upper tail coverts. Juveniles show thinly pale-tipped dark brown greater coverts and remiges while the tail is barred grey and brown usually with a narrow creamy tip. Dark morph juveniles may fade to pale buff or creamy often before molting into browner plumage. Subsequent stages are not as well-known but it appears dark morph subadults gradually manifest a darker brown or rufous brown color on the mantle, as well as on the head and upper breast while maintaining a buffish rear body (i.e. lower back and rump patch). Generally other morphs are similar but not as well-known and are perhaps individually inconsistent. Many are rufous or sandy after a molt but have mottling later on, the extent of pale feathers indicative perhaps of their ultimate adult morph.

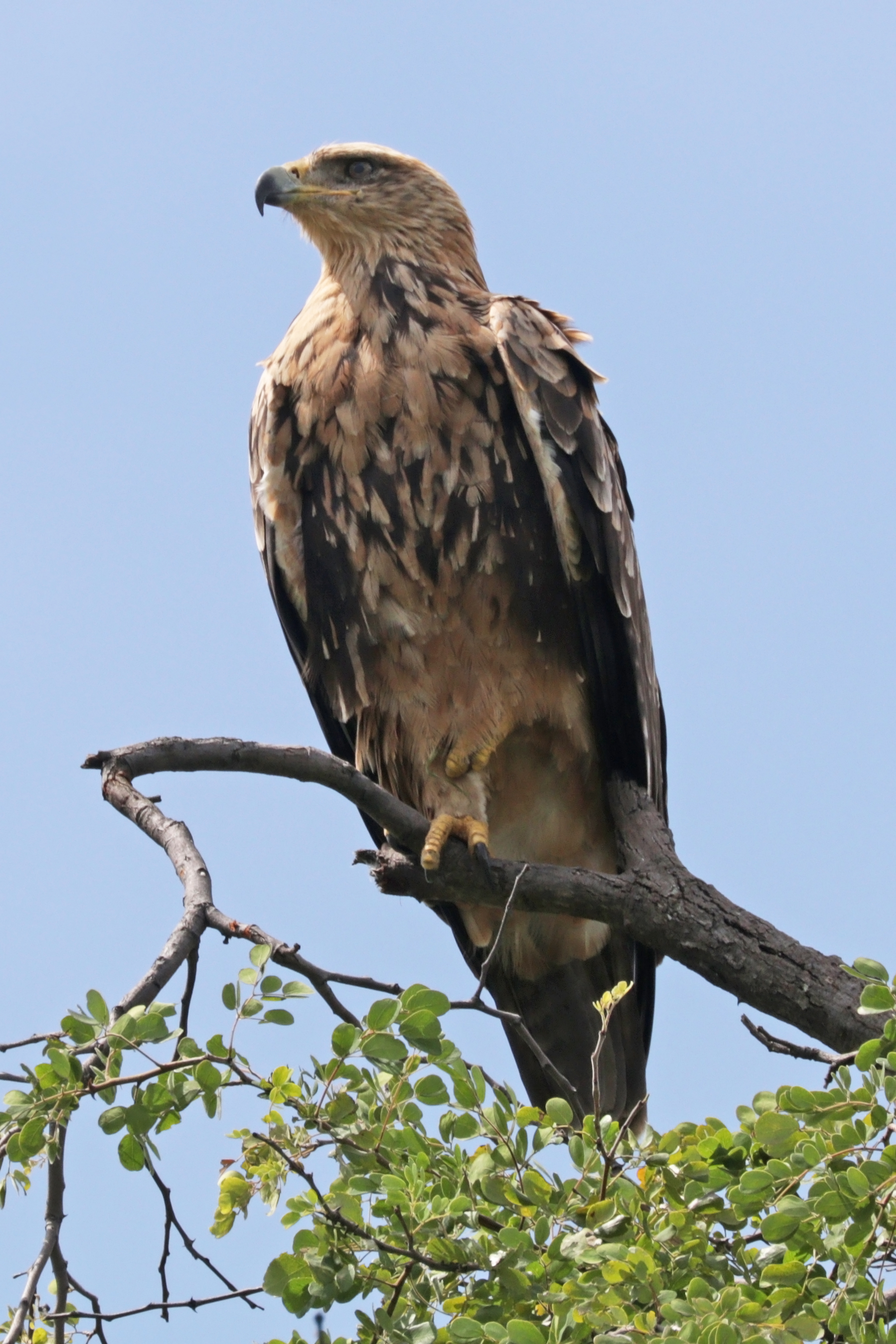
A streaked morph of the nominate subspecies of tawny eagle.

In flight, the tawny eagle appears as a large raptor with a noticeably protruding head on a long neck, with a deep chest, long and broad wings with a somewhat narrower seven-fingered hand. The trailing edge of the wing is slightly curved outwards, indenting at the junction of primaries and secondaries, whilst the rounded, medium-length tail is usually held spread. The deep beats of the kinked wings can make their flight appear rather heavy and slow but they are quicker and more expansive in wing movements and often less forceful-looking than larger Aquila like steppe eagles and can be very agile when chasing other raptors to rob them. Tawny eagles soar with flat wings or very slightly raised and hands only slightly lower, and may fly similarly in a glide but may too arch when in a fast glide. Adult dark morphs are more or less uniform dark brown above and below, showing indistinctly and slightly paler and greyish primaries on both sides. Above, the main contrast on dark morphs above is paler creamy rump patch while, on the underside, the greyish color is contrasted with blackish tips and a diffused trailing edge along both the wings and tail. Intermediate morph tawny eagles are variably rufous streaked on brown to rufous brown on the back and wing coverts with a similar contrasting pale rump above as dark morphs. Below the intermediate's heavy dark streaks are only subtly different and their coloring can appear almost uniform. The wing quills of intermediate morphs are often greyer with a stronger contrast of the paler inner primaries and blackish wing ends. Pale morph are all pale tawny or buffish on both sides of the wing, which contrasting strongly with demarcated dark brown about the greater coverts, flight feathers and tail and usually the scapulars. The primaries are quite pale on pale morphs with sometimes the hint of a pale carpal comma. Some pale adults have pale bases to all the underprimaries and the quills are sometimes unbarred, but more usually the feathers have dense but narrow dark bars. Dark morph juveniles are light rufous to pale tawny body above which contrasts strongly with dark brown greater coverts, rear scapulars, flight feathers and tail, in turn all highlighting the creamy lower back to tail coverts. Below dark morph juveniles can look similar to pale morph adults apart from trailing whitish edges and often irregular pale diagonals along tips of greater wing coverts, though usually these fade early on. Little is known plumage development but the young eagles moult into brown, becoming patchy with intermediate often showing 1-3 darker bars on wing linings. The underparts of subadults (i.e. around 2 to 3 years or old) are typically two-toned, with darker brown about the breasts, belly and underwings coverts while the remainder of the underbody is creamy light in colour. This two-toned pattern is evinced in subadult tawny eagles both from India and Africa. Adult plumage is obtained between the 4th and 5th years of life.

=== Size ===
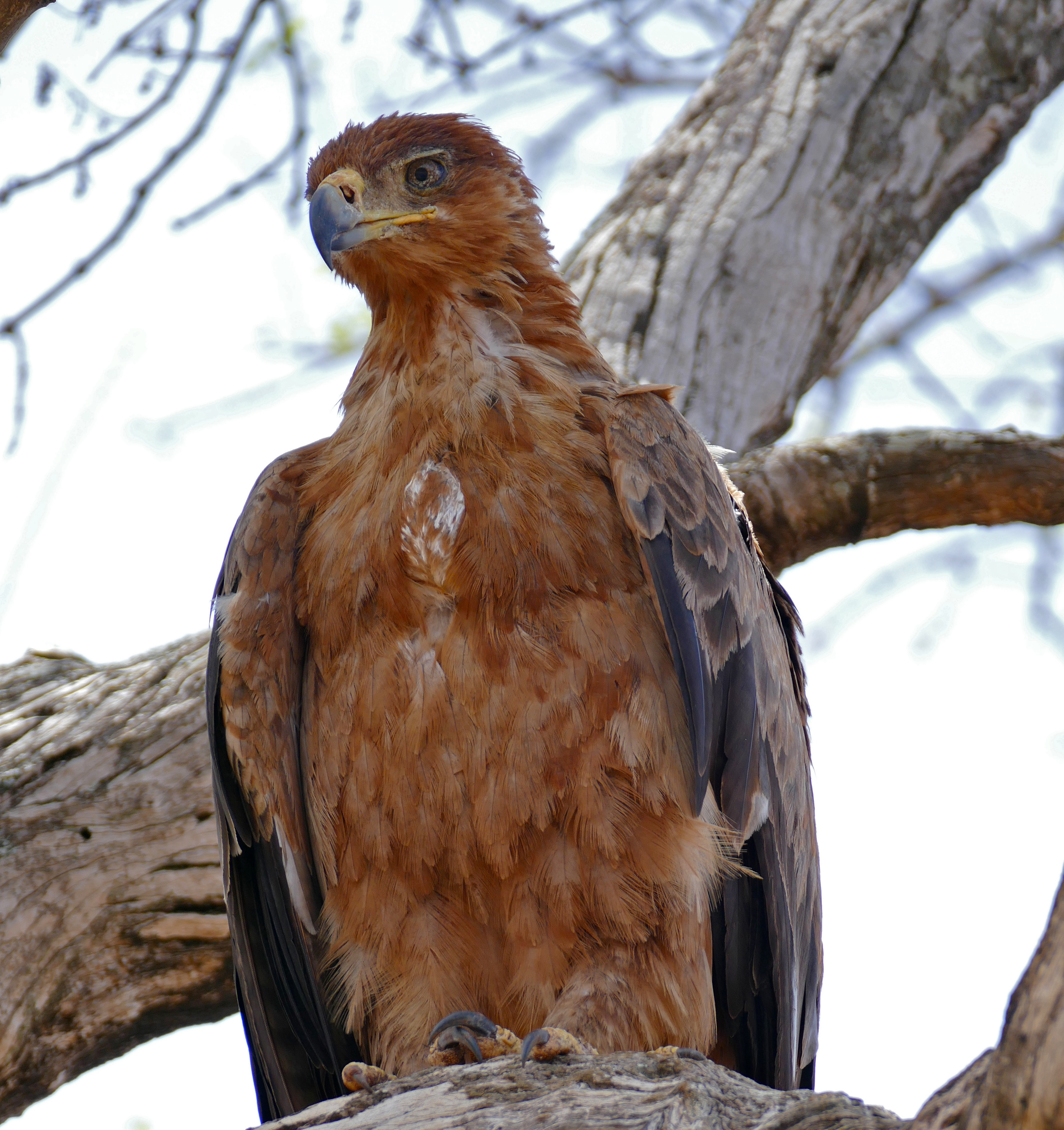
A richly rufous-colored tawny eagle.

This is a large bird of prey, though is medium-sized for an eagle and it is one of the smaller species in the genus Aquila. Among currently accepted species in the genus, it is of quite similar size to Bonelli's eagles (Aquila fasciata) (though is notably longer winged), slightly larger than African hawk-eagles (Aquila spilogaster) and much larger than Cassin's hawk-eagles (Aquila africanus). Otherwise, females of the larger species of Aquila are frequently around twice as heavy as an average tawny eagle. As is typical in birds of prey, the female tawny eagle is larger than the male, though relatively modestly so and a difference between the sexes is typically up to 15%. In total length, tawny eagles can measure from 58 to 75 cm (23 to 30 in). A typical length for a tawny eagle is considered about 65 cm (26 in). Wingspans can measure from 157 to 190 cm (5 ft 2 in to 6 ft 3 in). Weight can range in fully grown birds from 1.5 to 3.1 kg (3.3 to 6.8 lb). Average weights were reported in one study as 1.91 kg (4.2 lb) in 5 males and 1.97 kg (4.3 lb) in 5 females. In another study, 10 unsexed adult tawny eagles were found to have weighed 2.5 kg (5.5 lb) on average while, for the same data pool, a sample of 15 had an average wingspan of 182.9 cm (6 ft 0 in). Another small sample of African males, sample size four, averaged 1.85 kg (4.1 lb) while three females averaged 2.28 kg (5.0 lb). The mean mass of the species in one estimate was 2.3 kg (5.1 lb). In all standard measurements combined, the wing chord can vary from 473 to 565 mm (18.6 to 22.2 in), the tail from 242 to 295 mm (9.5 to 11.6 in) and the tarsus from 79 to 92 mm (3.1 to 3.6 in). The culmen length of Kenyan tawny eagles was measured at 33.3 to 42.4 mm (1.31 to 1.67 in), averaging 37.7 mm (1.48 in), while the gape width is 44 mm (1.7 in) on average, ranging from 40.3 to 49.9 mm (1.59 to 1.96 in). The hallux-claw, the enlarged rear talon often used as a killing instrument on accipitrids, can measure from 27 to 37.7 mm (1.06 to 1.48 in), averaging 31.8 mm (1.25 in) in one sample and 32.3 mm (1.27 in) in another. The talon size is not especially large for a booted eagle and is proportionately similar in size to those of steppe eagles and eastern imperial eagles (Aquila heliaca).

=== Confusion species ===
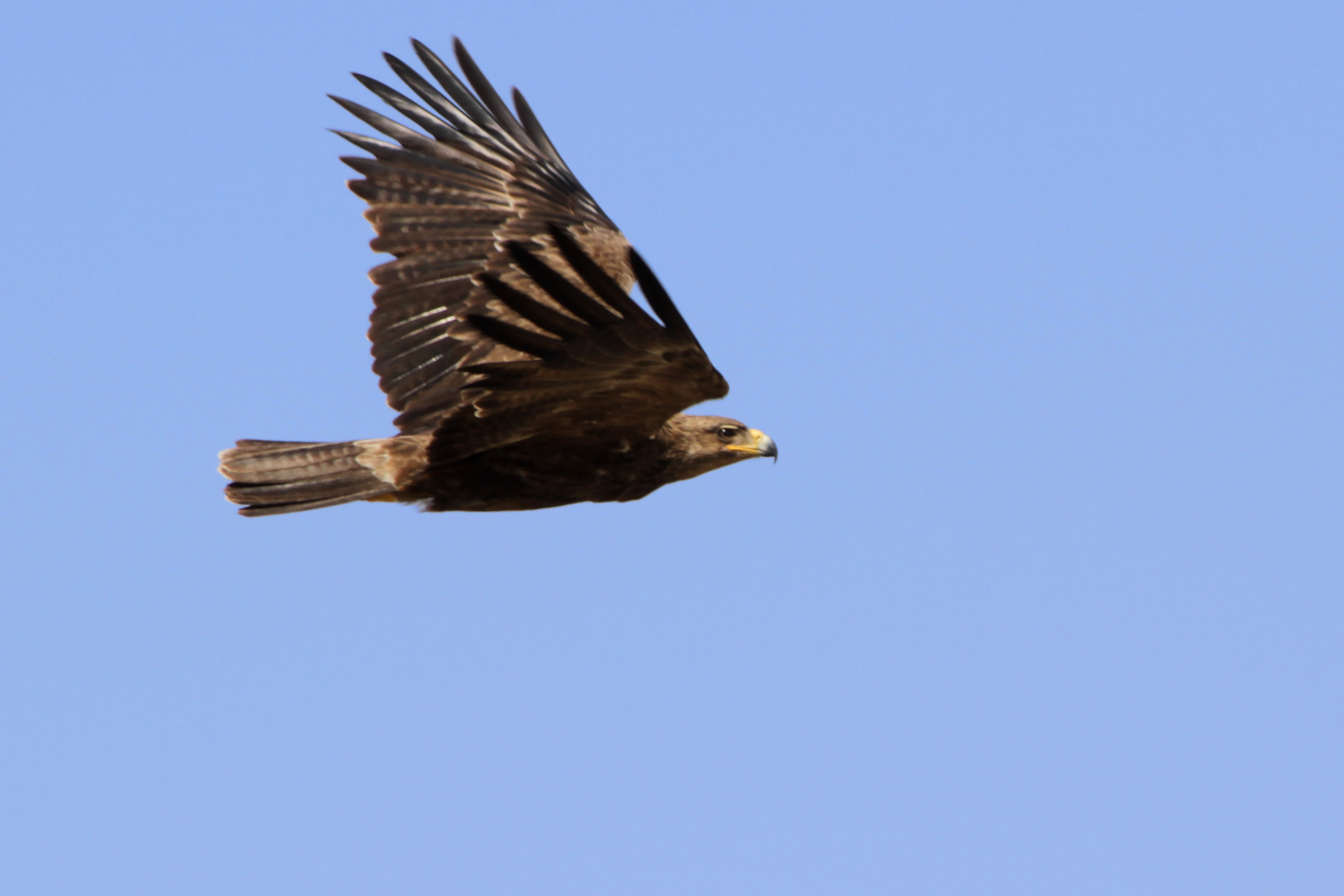
The slightly darker northern and central African subspecies, A. r. belisarius, in flight displaying the species typical flight profile.

The tawny eagle lives in multiple areas where other broadly similar brownish hued and largish raptors often occur. Thus identification is seldom straightforward.

One source that can especially engender potential confusion in its wintering range is the formerly conspecific steppe eagle. The steppe is larger with a shorter neck, relatively longer and narrower wings, a more massive beak, particularly via the exceptional depth of the gape (although in flight can appear smaller headed due its less protruding neck) and has a longer and rounder tail. Furthermore, steppe eagles tends to have much bolder and widely spaced barring on the wings than tawny eagles and more distinct dark trailing wing edges and paler throats.

Beyond steppe eagles, comparisons to various other groups of sympatric booted eagles may be made. Compared to the spotted eagles, the tawny eagle's tail is longer, the bill more prominent, the wings usually less squared-off in flight, the neck longer and the overall look rangier, despite these species being of often similar size. In contrast to the imperial eagles, the wings of the tawny eagle are broader and have less even trailing edges, the bill is slightly less prominent, and the wings are more likely to be held slightly upwards, while the body size is smaller. When compared to the golden eagle species complex, of which only the golden and the Verreaux's eagle (Aquila verreauxii) are usually relevant (although three dissimilar and sympatric pale-bellied eagles, of a size with tawny eagles or smaller, are found as part of this evolutionary chain), the tawny eagle is considerably smaller, its wings do not taper as much nor are they as likely to be held in a strong dihedral, and proportionately, the bill is notably longer and the tail is rather shorter. Greater spotted eagles (Clanga clanga), like the steppe eagle a Palearctic breeding eagle who often winters in the resident range of tawny eagles, is fairly similar, but that species has a relatively shorter and broader tail, less baggy feathers on the legs and usually a rather darker and more uniform adult plumage. The fulvescens form of the greater spotted eagle must be distinguished from the pale forms of the tawny eagle by its underwing pattern, often with completely blackish underwing coverts and usually plain looking dark remiges over the entire primaries with more distinct pale carpal arcs. The likewise migratory lesser spotted eagle (Clanga pomarina) is smaller than the tawny eagle and more compact with a distinct white U above the tail. The residential African Wahlberg's eagle (Hieraeetus wahlbergi) can have a similar uniform plumage as in tawny eagles but always has greyer flight feathers and is much smaller than tawny eagles with relatively longer and more rectangular wings and a longer, narrower and straighter-tipped tail. The eastern imperial eagle in juvenile plumage can appear similar to the pale and intermediate morph tawny eagles, but the imperial eagle is usually visibly larger, with slenderer, longer wings, a longer, broader tail as well as having dark brown streaking on the chest, mantle and wing coverts and bearing more distinct pale trailing edges and wing bars.

Dark-morph tawny eagles in India may be distinguished from similarly sized black eagles (Ictinaetus malaiensis) by the latter being slenderer and having longer, darker and more paddle-shaped wings with a narrower base and a much longer, narrower and distinctly barred tail. More dissimilar eagles such as Circaetinae, i.e. brown snake eagles (Circaetus cinereus), black-breasted snake eagles (Circaetus pectoralis) and juvenile bateleurs (Terathopius ecaudatus), are sometimes mentioned as a potential source of confusion but are usually rather distinct (all larger headed, rather smaller billed, shorter tailed and bare legged with often less uniform coloring) even in their most similar hues.

=== Calls ===
Tawny eagles are generally silent in most of their range. However, unlike steppe eagles, which are almost always silent away from their breeding grounds, they are said to occasionally vocalize in any season. They are also more vocal when not breeding than the spotted eagles. The usual call is a harsh, hollow-sounding, loud bark, variously transcribed as kowk-kowk, kau-kau, kiok-kiok or ki-ark. The call is fairly high-pitched (slightly less deep than the steppe eagle's when the latter is breeding) but is still deeper voiced than spotted eagles. In Kruger National Park it is said the call is loud and far-travelling. Male tawny eagles are the most frequent vocalizers in the species, particularly during sky-dances, but also in other contexts. These include but are not limited to food arguments, disturbances during nesting and males attracting females for food passes. In nine years of monitoring tawny eagles in Zimbabwe, however, the call was not heard once. Its silence there may be due to the flat landscape. Other call recorded include a harsh grating k eke ke... in aerial courtship displays and a throaty kra in kleptoparastic pursuits. A kra-kra call may emitted at times to warn intruders. The female may also emit an occasional mewing, high shreep-shreep at the nest as well as a rare raucous scream (possible food-begging and alarm calls, respectively). The young chick tawny eagle chips initially but once its feathers emerge, it tends to beg with a loud call, i.e. we-yik, wee-yik.

== Distribution and habitat ==
Tawny eagles have an extremely extensive natural distribution. The African population can be found in three, fairly discrete populations. One of these is found in North Africa in south-central Morocco, possibly northern Algeria, southwestern Mauritania, Senegambia, southern Mali, central and southern Niger eastward through southern Chad, northern and central Sudan to most of Ethiopia and Somalia (but for the northeast and central-east). The north African population is scarce. In Morocco, they are heavily depleted with a few populations left in some regions such as Tarfaya, Tan-Tan and Souss-Massa. They are likely extirpated from Tunisia, where they were once frequent. In West Africa, some tawny eagles occur in Gambia, Togo, Nigeria and (though possibly not breeding) in Ivory Coast and Ghana. In east Africa and central Africa, the tawny eagle is found in central and eastern Democratic Republic of the Congo and throughout the drier portions of Uganda and in the entire nations of Kenya, Tanzania, Zambia (quite often residing in the Luangwa valley and the Chambeshi drainage), Malawi and Mozambique. In east Africa, it is considered perhaps the most widely distributed and regularly sighted brown eagle. In southern Africa, the tawny eagle is found throughout Zimbabwe (now often rare apart from Matabeleland and Chipinga Uplands), Botswana (still regular in Okavango Delta) and some areas of Namibia, southern and western Angola (Cuando Cubango, Cunene, Huíla Namibe, to Malanje), Eswatini, Lesotho and northern and central parts of South Africa, i.e. mainly north of the Orange River but sometimes down to the Cape Province. The tawny eagle may be extinct as a breeder in Eswatini where it was last confirmed to have bred in 2001.

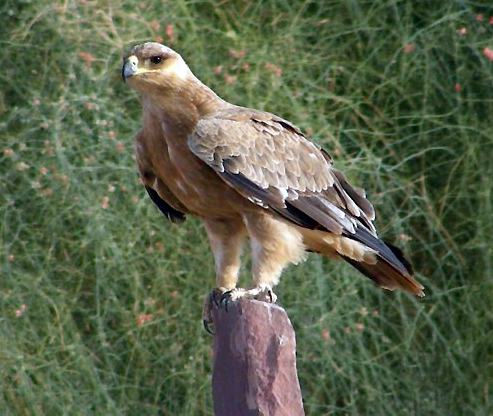
A tawny eagle perched in Rajasthan in India.

Out of Africa, the species may possibly be found in the southwestern part of the Arabian Peninsula, i.e. in Yemen and extreme southwestern Saudi Arabia in the Tihamah and 'Asir Regions, but few to none confirmed breeding events have been reported in the last few decades. The tawny eagle is considered a rare vagrant in Israel, though some are verified, other reports of them often turn out to be misidentified steppe eagles. They are also known as a rare vagrant in Oman. In Asia, the tawny eagle exists in isolation in southeastern Iran (as in Arabia, verified recent breeding is not known) and somewhat more continuously in eastern Pakistan (often in the Indus valley), much of north and peninsular India, eastward scarcely through southern Nepal and Assam. Though Nepali tawny eagles are rarely recorded, it is thought that the species still resides there in lowland semi-deserts. The Indian range is from Punjab through the Indo-Gangetic Plain and western Bengal, northeastern Bihar, the Deccan Plateau with range continuing down to Andhra Pradesh, Karnataka and (mainly north-central) Tamil Nadu. Records of vagrating tawny eagles turning up in Myanmar, northern Vietnam and Thailand are thought to have been likely misidentified steppe eagles or are based on now unidentifiable specimens. A small handful of vagrants have been verified to turn up in Sri Lanka (the only known appearance by an Aquila eagle there). Old reports of vagrancy, probably in need of confirmation, are known also from Afghanistan.

=== Habitat ===
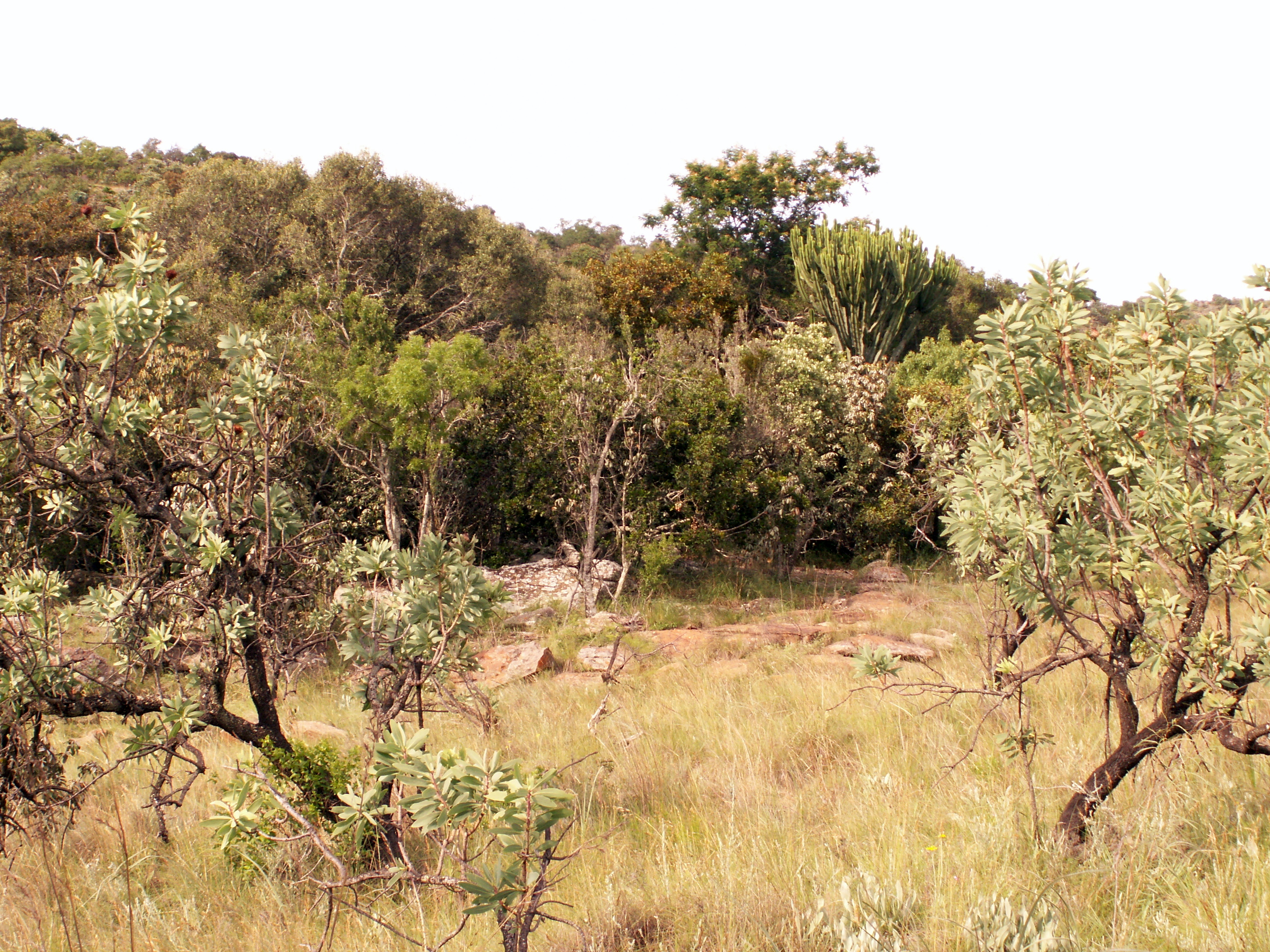
Tawny eagles are often at home in the arid and yet rich bushveld.

Tawny eagles occurs in fairly open country at varied elevations but usually live in drier areas. In West Africa, the species breeds often in relatively moist forest-savanna mosaics but can move into dry woodlands and semi-deserts when not breeding. In Morocco, the species prefers forested areas near mountains with adjacent plains. Elsewhere in Africa, tawny eagles typically inhabit wooded savanna such as dry Acacia savanna and semi-desert to desert areas. However, extreme desert areas, completely lacking in arborescent growth, are avoided nearly as much so as humid tropical rainforests. It also occurs at times in manmade areas such as arable lands, roadsides, dams, farmland, cattle pastures and game areas if feeding opportunities occur in them. In southern Africa, thornveld is often the preferred habitat with the tawny eagles mostly preferring stands of Acacia. Despite similar climates, within the miombo woodland, the tawny eagle tends to be more scarce. In India, similar habitats may largely be used but the tawny eagle may fairly often occur too in the vicinity of villages and cultivations and frequents garbage dumps and slaughterhouses somewhat more so than they do in Africa. In addition to all gradients of arid zones, in India, the tawny eagle frequently is found around thorn forests. Tawny eagles may live from sea level to about 3,000 m (9,800 ft) but tends to prefer somewhat lower elevations. Despite a certain level of aridity expected in tawny eagle habitats, they normally will not nest unless a habitat meets certain demands. The tawny eagle's presence is predicated on the availability of ephemeral rainfall during the wet season. This reliance on some rainfall is probably key to habitat quality and resulting prey populations to some extent, but also to the availability of nesting sites. The tawny eagle is by and large an obligate tree nester and so areas that become too arid to support tree growth or where trees are overharvested are unlikely to retain the species.

== Behaviour ==
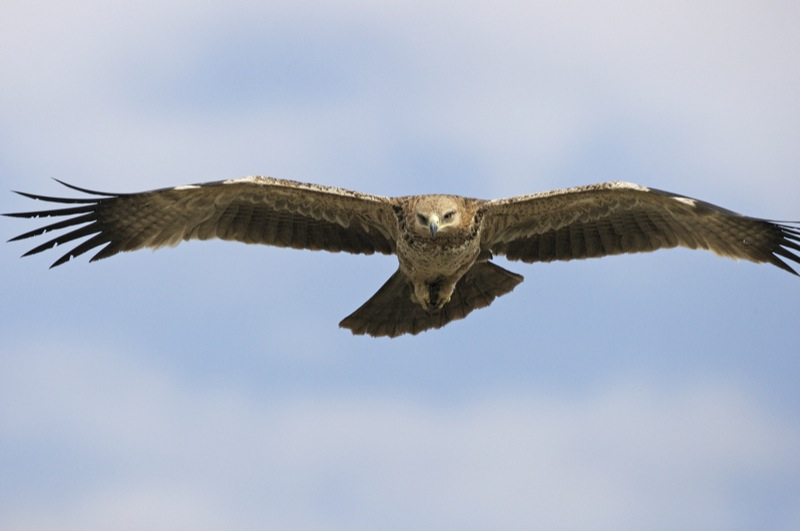
A tawny eagle in flight.

The tawny eagle, quite unlike the steppe eagle, is largely sedentary and non-migratory. However, in Africa it is at times considered to be fairly nomadic and can engage in some seasonal movements. In west Africa, A. r. belisarius rather regularly travels shorter distance to damp woodlands during October through November, returning north in April, and perhaps at least at times, migrates into Kalahari region of Botswana and may vagrate to southern South Africa. Sometimes, tawny eagles seem to ping semi-regularly between Ethiopia and west Africa. Some long distance wandering has even been reported, such as a vagrant A. r. belisarius in Tunisia and as far as Egypt (where twice recorded in the 1950s) and even Israel (3 winter records in the 1990s) and Oman. From the Indian range, individuals vagrate not infrequently to nearby Bangladesh, most likely as juveniles post-dispersal wanderings, but reports of the species wandering into southeast Asia such as Thailand are now considered likely apocryphal. Generally, in areas such as southern Africa, tawny eagles usually seldom seem to leave their established breeding territories and juvenile eagles generally wander no more than several dozen kilometres from their original nest. A bird banded as a nestling in Esigodini was recovered quite nearby at Fort Rixon more than two years later. However, in a rather far dispersal for southern Africa, one eagle banded as a nestling was recovered 330 km (210 mi) away from its nest of origin in Zimbabwe four years later. Inconsistent and seemingly unpredictable movements by tawny eagles have been proven via experimental ecological studies to be actually be instances of eagles searching out new areas to compensate for lack of rainfall. While non-breeding steppe eagles are often slightly social and flock at opportunistic feeding sources, the tawny eagle is usually considered solitary. However, groups of two to three tawny eagles are sometimes seen, such as in the Indian subcontinent, but occasionally group sizes may even exceed this figure. In the Mirpur Division of Azad Kashmir in Pakistan, small flocks of tawny eagles have reportedly been witnessed gathering in warmer spots between November and February, over three years of study. Small groups or aggregations are known to occur in Africa as well near concentrated foods and even communal roost have been reported in trees, power pylons or on the ground. Like many large raptors, the tawny eagle probably spends the majority of its day perched but take wing a few times a day. Unlike most large eagles, in India at least, tawny eagles are often fairly accustomed to humans and may allow fairly close approach by observers.

== Feeding ==
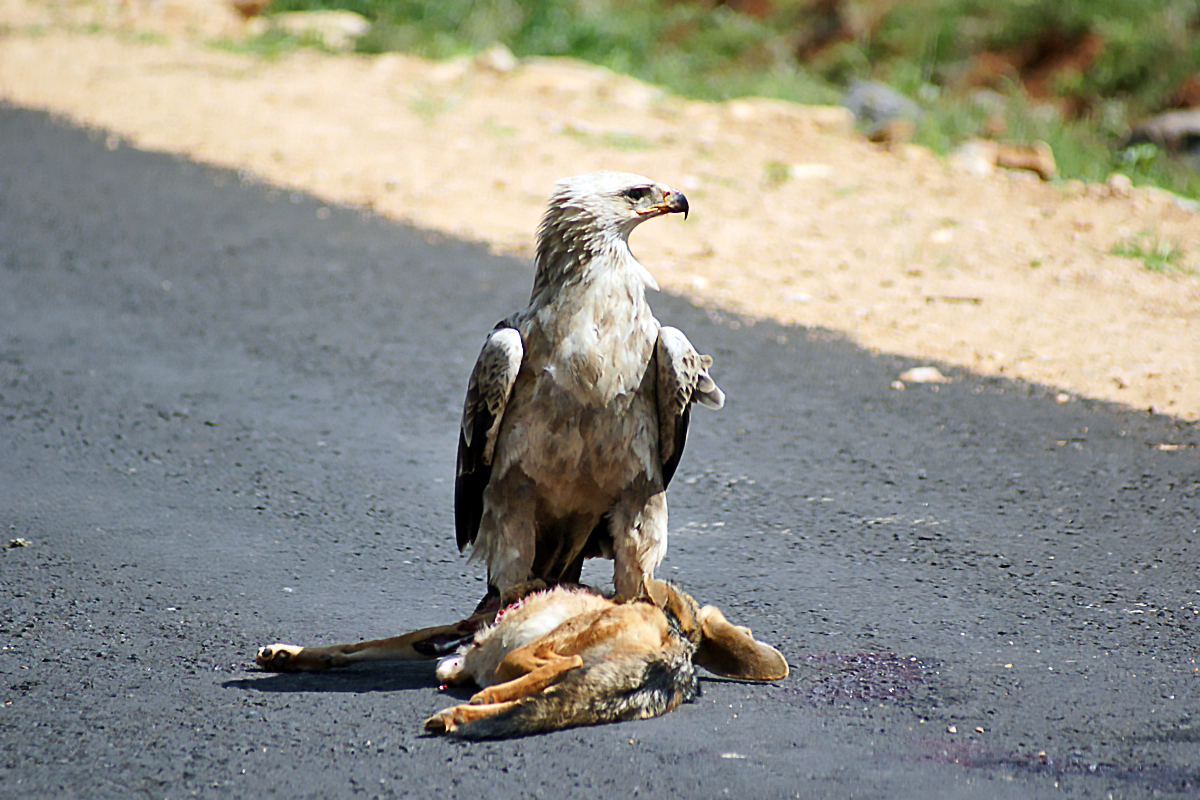
With a black-backed jackal, road traffic victim in Ethiopia.

The tawny eagle is unique as an Aquila eagle in the lack of apparent specialization in its feeding behaviour. While most other Aquila will opportunistically scavenge, the tawny eagle freely takes to scavenging on carrion, perhaps doing so at all times of the year, though do so somewhat more so when not breeding. Routine scavenging often drives tawny eagles to refuse dumps in or near villages and slaughterhouses, particularly in India, and to associate quite often with vultures at carrion sites. They are also frequently recorded on roadsides where roadkill provides a steady food source. More routinely than almost any other raptor, perhaps, it is a very skilled pirate, regularly engaging in kleptoparasitism of other birds of prey. However, descriptions of the tawny eagle as "sluggish", "not very distinguished" and "unimpressive" are not particularly apt as the tawny eagle is a highly rapacious predator that attacks very variable ranges of live prey including particularly large prey. This species hunts mainly by a short dive or pounce from a perch or by stoop from up high in a soaring flight. In the Indian subcontinent, preferred hunting perch trees were Vachellia nilotica, Prosopis cineraria and Capparis decidua. It may also often forage by walking on the ground. Mostly, tawny eagles target live prey that is on the ground, seldom targeting arboreal prey. However, they will sometimes fly down and take birds on the wing. Avian prey known to be killed in the air has ranged from speckled pigeons (Columba guinea) to flamingoes. Tawny eagles may hunt frequently in pairs during the breeding season, often securing larger prey than in the non-breeding season. Sometimes this tandem hunting by pairs can occur in any season. It is likely that tandem hunting by pairs involves one bird engaging in conspicuous flight to distract the quarry while another flies inconspicuously to sneak up on and kill the prey, as has been reported in other tandem hunting raptors. Nocturnal animals such as genets and springhares have been preyed upon by tawny eagles in areas where there was no possibility they were killed by traffic at night. In addition to other observations have been made where tawny eagles drink and bathe at night, some nocturnal subsistence behaviour by this species has been inferred but no irrefutable evidence has been brought forth either. Semi-regular attendance at grassfires in India, presumably in order to capture displaced creatures, has been reported. More than 200 species, including both live prey and carrion, are known to be eaten by tawny eagles and they may have one of the most variable diet of all tropical eagles. Reportedly, most prey the tawny eagle will take alive will weigh not less than 125 g (4.4 oz) and not more than 2.5 kg (5.5 lb), however live prey has been revealed to be regularly more variable than even that estimate represents. One compilation study showed that, compared to 8 other Aquila and spotted eagles, the tawny eagle's diet was the most evenly spread across all weight classes of prey from under 63 g (2.2 oz) to over 4 kg (8.8 lb), though took prey in the latter prey class slightly less so than the much larger golden and wedge-tailed eagles (Aquila audax). This study further determine that the most often focused on weight class in tawny eagle's diets were 0.5 to 1 kg (1.1 to 2.2 lb) and 1 to 2 kg (2.2 to 4.4 lb) prey class, accounting for a little less than half of the prey by quantity. According to this authority, the mean prey size falls around approximately 921 g (2.030 lb), which is around 5 times greater than the mean estimated prey size for the steppe eagle species, around 38% greater than mean estimated prey size of imperial eagles and considerably less only than the golden, wedge-tailed and Verreaux's eagles among the 8 studied Aquila and Clanga species.

=== Probable live prey ===
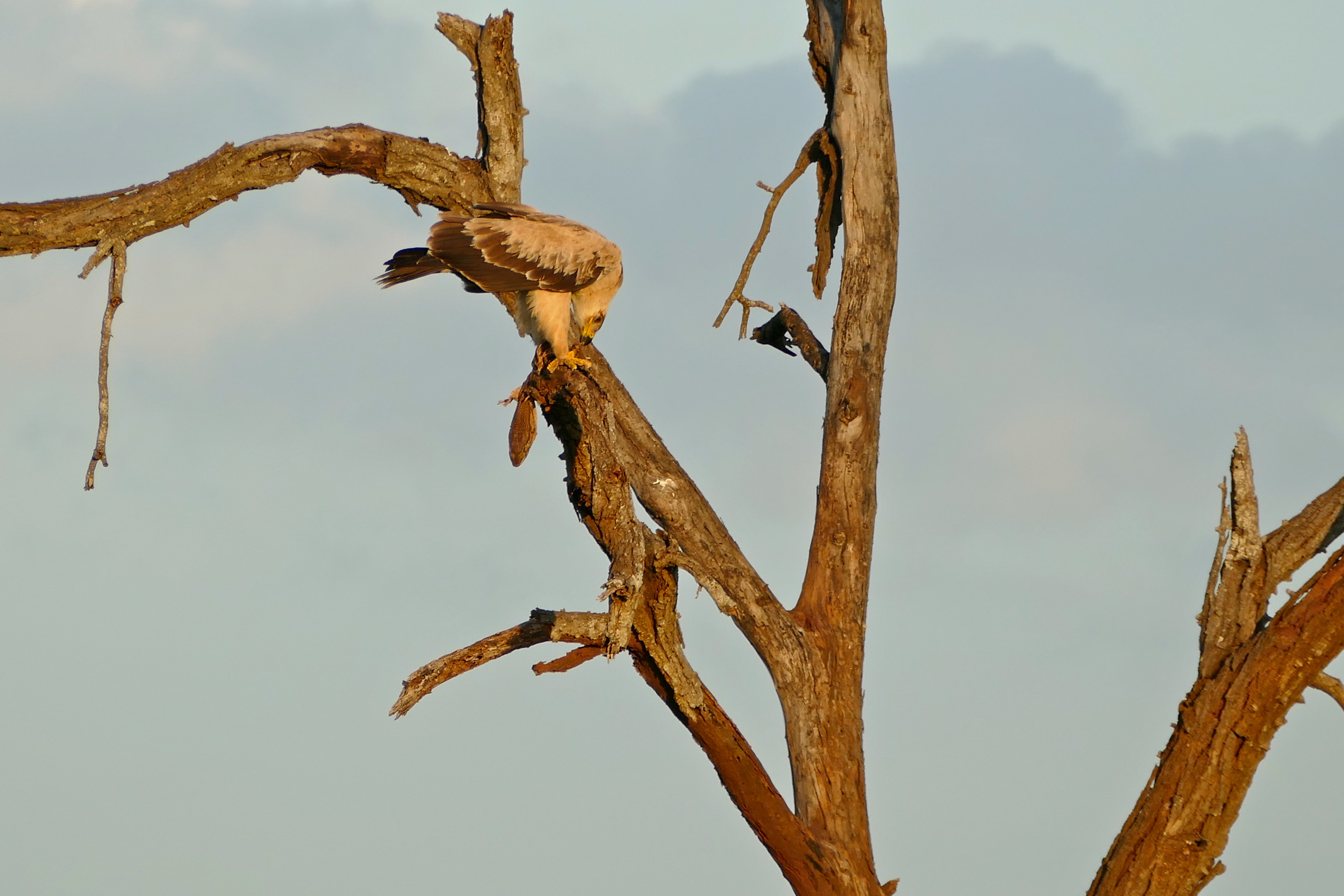
A tawny eagle with its prey, a rock monitor.

Determining whether prey has been taken alive at the nests of tawny eagles is generally considered to be difficult, although observations suggest that during breeding tawny eagles usually deliver fresh prey while raising young, indicating that such prey are usually either taken alive or newly pirated from other predators. Within a Kenyan study, only 1.9% of prey brought to tawny eagle nests was thought likely to be from carrion. While hunting prey, it often takes a variety of prey usually focusing somewhat on small to medium-sized mammals, usually medium-sized to large birds and occasionally medium to large-sized reptiles. A diet analysis in Zimbabwe indicated that among 160 prey items, 36.9% were mammals, 51.9% were birds, 10% were reptiles and 1.2% were amphibians. The leading prey species here were scrub hare (Lepus saxatilis), at about 15.6% of the total, helmeted guineafowl (Numida meleagris), at about 11.9% of the prey total, both chickens and unidentified snakes at around 6.9% and indeterminate spurfowl and doves at 6.2% and 5%, respectively. A similar dietary study conducted in Lochinvar National Park, Zambia found a higher proportion of birds and amphibians (61.4% & 5.5% respectively), with a surprisingly number of water birds being taken. Of 127 prey items here, the main prey species were determined to be helmeted guineafowl at about 15% of the diet, Swainson's spurfowl (Pternistis swainsonii) at 11%, poultry at about 8.7%, the African openbill (Anastomus lamelligerus) at 7.9% with the top mammals in the diet being scrub hares, at 5.5%, and African marsh rats (Dasymys incomtus) at 3.9%; furthermore indeterminate snakes comprised 5.5% of the diet. The variation in diet between the preceding two study sites is due to differences in habitat and prey availability. A very detailed study was conducted in Tsavo East National Park, Kenya, of the diet of the local tawny eagles over different years. Of 543 total prey items, 41.2% were mammals, 35.4% were birds, and 23.4% were reptiles and amphibians. Of these the most important prey was Kirk's dik-dik (Madoqua kirkii) at 21.7% of the total, yellow-necked spurfowl (Pternistis leucoscepus) at 6.8% of the total, cape hare (Lepus capensis) and crested francolin (Dendroperdix sephaena) both at 6.3% and red-crested korhaan (Lophotis ruficrista) at 5.9%; additionally, unidentified snakes constituted 21.3% of the foods. The dik-dik is a small antelope and is much larger than a tawny eagle. The tawny eagle certainly took dik-diks weighing up to 4 kg (8.8 lb) and possibly even 5 kg (11 lb), with this eagle taking about 80 dik-diks in Tsavo East each year. In different areas of South Africa, small dietary studies determined the diet at nests to be highly variable. In the Highveld, about 52% of 60 prey items were mammals, 45% were birds and a small number were fish. In Timbavati and Klaserie, 63% of the diet was birds, 34% of it was mammals and 3% were reptiles. At Highveld, 25% of the diet consisted of yellow mongoose (Cynictis penicillata), 15% Cape ground squirrels (Xerus inauris) and 13% helmeted guineafowl. At Timbavati and Klaserie, various francolins were strongly predominant in foods, at about 44% with another 17% by various mongooses.

Out of the southern and eastern areas of Africa, less quantitative analysis has been undertaken into the feeding habits of tawny eagles, even around nests. What is known of their prey elsewhere is mainly from wide-ranging surveys, secondary accounts and photographs. It appears in Ethiopia that the tawny eagle may have a close predatory relationship with the Abyssinian grass rat (Arvicanthis abyssinicus) while one tawny eagle there tore open the nest of the Stresemann's bushcrow (Zavattariornis stresemanni) to access the prey. Unidentified large rats constituted a great majority of prey delivered during the nestling growth stage at some east African nests. Fewer details are known about the prey of tawny eagles in the Indian subcontinent. One study, without quantitative data known, listed the prey of tawny eagles in Saurashtra as Indian palm squirrels (Funambulus palmarum), eggs of red-wattled lapwings (Vanellus indicus), crows, mongooses, Indian hares (Lepus nigricollis) and even Bengal fox (Vulpes bengalensis). Otherwise, the prey incidentally reported in India is extremely varied, including even the hindlegs of a jungle cat (Felis chaus) (but this may have been scavenged). In general, tawny eagles in south Asia may focus on less varying prey in general, often reportedly favoring desert-dwelling rodents and hares. Tawny eagles may hunt a couple dozen species of rodent from different parts of the range, ranging in size from the 30 g (1.1 oz) Natal multimammate mouse (Mastomys natalensis) to the 3.6 kg (7.9 lb) South African springhare (Pedestes capensis). Rock hyrax (Procavia capensis) and yellow-spotted rock hyrax (Heterohyrax brucei) are occasionally preyed upon by tawny eagles. The tawny eagle may be one of the most accomplished predators of mongoose, many food studies reflecting relatively high numbers of them and they appear to be one of the most feared predators at meerkat (Suricata suricatta) colonies. In the Karoo, the local tawny eagles reportedly live mostly off of mongooses, either meerkats or yellow mongooses. Similarly small or slightly larger carnivores like striped polecats (Ictonyx striatus) and genets are not infrequently prey for tawny eagles as well. Bat-eared foxes (Otocyon megalotis) may too be taken alive at times. Various monkeys may be eaten, although not infrequently as carrion, tawny eagles may too in seldom cases attack juveniles of monkeys such as Patas monkeys (Erythrocebus patas), grivets (Chlorocebus aethiops) and vervet monkeys (Chlorocebus pygerythrus) up to the size of juveniles of several species of baboon. However, unlike with larger eagles, the troops of certain baboons do not seem to regard tawny eagles as a threat based on their behavioural responses. While most ungulate prey other than dik-diks is probably largely scavenged as carrion or stolen from other predators, the small calves of ungulates such as Thomson's gazelle (Eudorcas thomsonii) are sometimes apparently killed by tawny eagles. A general picture appears to emerge that tawny eagles quite often takes relatively large mammalian prey, surprisingly often creatures weighing up to 3 to 4 kg (6.6 to 8.8 lb) such as hares, dik-diks, the young of other antelopes, hyraxes and so on.

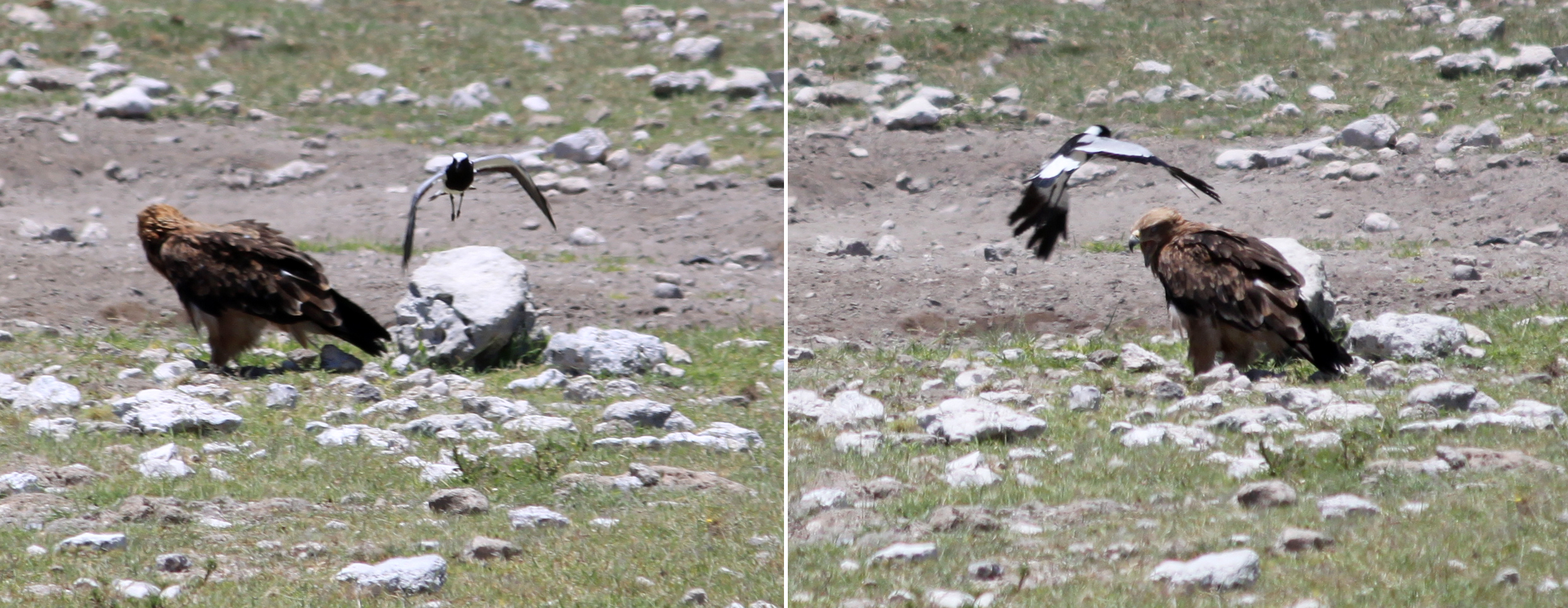
A tawny eagle is mobbed by a blacksmith lapwing; these eagles are a potential menace to many different kinds of birds.

While mammals prey varies from rodents to hares, mongooses and small antelopes, the diversity and size range of bird taken may be even more impressive and more than 120 avian prey species have been reported in the prey spectrum. Included in the prey spectrum are various species of ducks and small or gosling geese, gamebirds, especially francolins and guineafowl, many doves and pigeons, mostly medium-sized species of bustard and hornbill and numerous water birds from small coursers, lapwings, rails and grebes to large flamingoes, storks and herons both small and large. Both young and adult Old World flamingoes of both African species are known to be attacked on occasion, as well as white-breasted cormorants (Phalacrocorax lucidus) and great cormorants (Phalacrocorax carbo), all birds similar in size or somewhat heavier than the tawny eagle itself. Further impressive water bird prey includes reportedly spur-winged goose (Plectropterus gambensis), which weighs about twice as much as tawny eagle. Even larger avian prey are taken including a common crane (Grus grus) killed by a pair in Saurashtra (although it was an injured one) and presumably adult female Kori bustard (Ardeotis kori). If average-sized, these prey items likely weighed more than 5 kg (11 lb). More minor avian prey includes nightjars, coucals, sandgrouse, swifts, bee-eaters, kingfishers, rollers, wood hoopoes, turacos, parrots and several passerines. One small passerine the tawny eagle may routinely hunt is the super-abundant red-billed quelea (Quelea quelea). Near poultry farms, tawny eagles can take to not infrequently lifting free-range chickens (Gallus gallus domesticus) and other poultry, especially when the eagles must feed their young, thus in turn potentially drawing ire of local farmers.

Various snakes are taken opportunistically by tawny eagles and they can be quite bold about hunting venomous snakes. In southern Africa and Kenya the following snakes have been identified in the foods of tawny eagles: Egyptian sand boa (Eryx colubrinus), young African rock python (Python sebae), speckled sand racer (Psammophis punctulatus), rufous beaked snake (Rhamphiophis oxyrhynchus), black-necked spitting cobra (Naja nigricollis), black mamba (Dendroaspis polylepis), boomslang (Dispholidus typus) and puff adder (Bitis arietans). They also hunt lizards not infrequently given the chance, usually favoring fairly large species but capable of taking those ranging from geckos to rock monitors (Varanus albigularis). At one nest in Zimbabwe, monitor lizards made up 29% of 83 prey items, but they were only 8% of 107 prey items of 3 other nests in the same park. One of the most frequently seen prey to be taken by tawny eagles in India have been Indian spiny-tailed lizard (Saara hardwickii). More minor prey have included turtles, frogs and toads and fish. A tawny eagle in southern Africa was seen to wade into shallow water and successfully pull out a largish catfish. Tawny eagles can also take communal nesting and swarming insects fairly frequently. These are generally termites, which can attract several of these eagles especially amongst non-breeding eagles and young ones. When visiting termites, the tawny eagles commonly eat alates and may, with an unusual lack of aggression, share the food source with several other birds of prey, including as many as a half dozen conspecifics. At times, tawny eagles can also be attracted to swarms of grasshoppers. In one case, a tawny eagle was seen consuming the fruit of an Adansonia tree, an unusual instance of frugivory which is very rare in accipitrids other than one unusual species: the palm-nut vulture (Gypohierax angolensis). A tawny eagle was once witnessed picking through elephant dung along with a vulture, presumably searching for dung beetles to consume.

=== Carrion ===
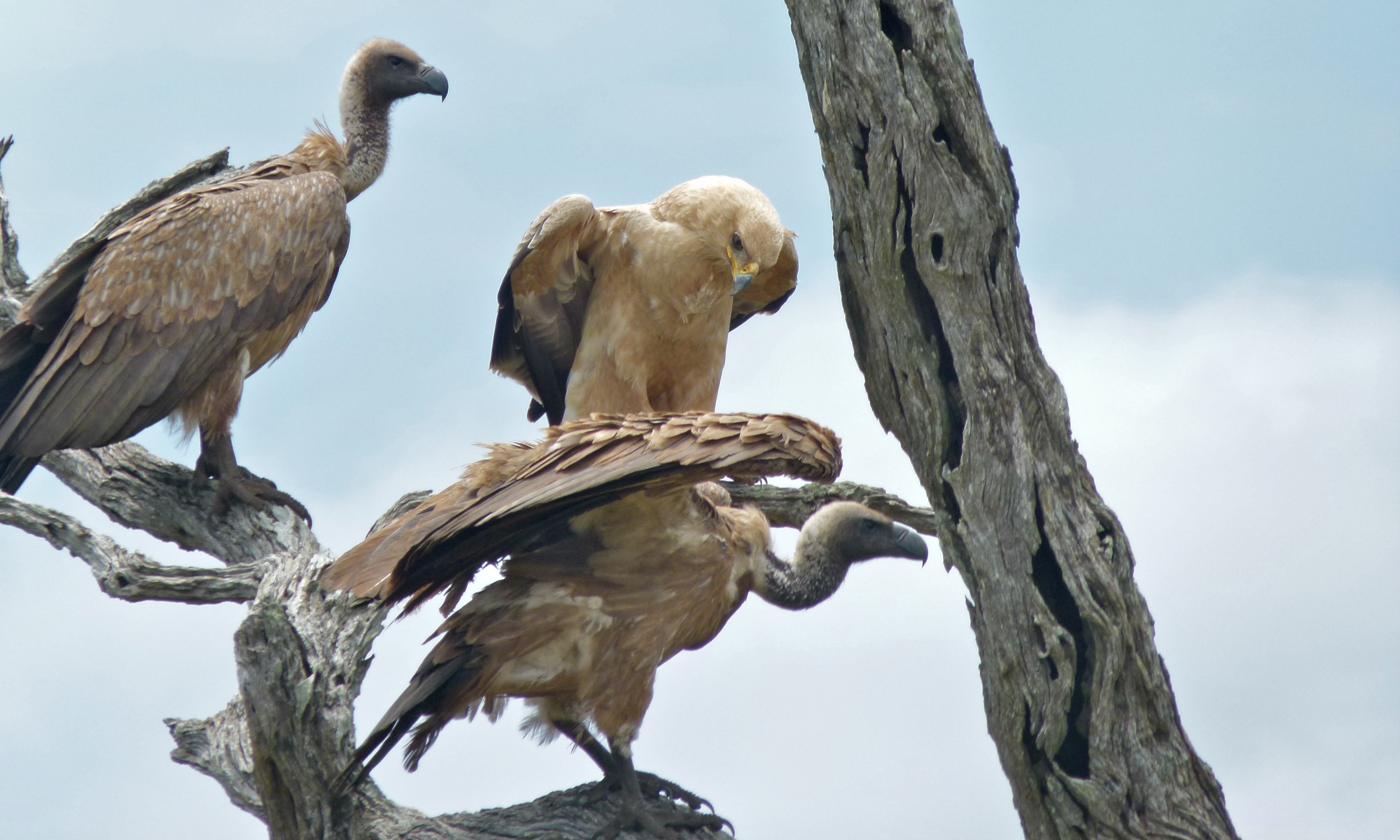
A tawny eagle perched amongst white-backed vultures, with which they are often obligated to share carrion in Africa.

Although the tawny eagle does hunt for food, it also relies extensively on carrion as a food source. Although most booted eagles and Aquila will opportunistically feed on carrion, none is known to do so as routinely as the tawny eagle. They have been recorded feeding on a huge array of carcasses as large as African bush elephants (Loxodonta africana) and at least as small as vervet monkeys and perhaps even down to the size of a dove. Perhaps most frequently in Africa, tawny eagles will feed at carcasses of ungulates such as antelope. At least 30-40 different species of ungulate have been recorded as carrion food-sources for these eagles. At "vulture restaurants" in Ethiopia, feeding stations with dead livestock meant to mitigate the rapid decline in population of most African vultures, the tawny eagle was the second most often recorded scavenger at just under 35% of 1088 of recorded birds to feed at them. The tawny eagle shares its carrion food sources almost invariably with vultures and usually with several other scavengers such as jackals and hyenas. Other birds that frequently also attend carrion are bateleurs, many other eagles (including steppe eagles) and marabou storks (Leptoptilos crumenifer). The producer-scrounger theory predicts that vultures rely on eagles for information on carcasses. Due to their smaller size, eagles, i.e. tawny eagles and bateleurs, are able to begin foraging earlier in the morning and are thus more likely to locate a carcass first. In 91 observed carcass in southern Africa, tawny eagles were verified to be the first to find 5 of them. Furthermore, vultures usually arrived in less than 40 minutes (in 75% of cases) after the tawny eagles found the carcass. At large carcasses, there is a hierarchical social structure based on the size of the scavenger. At Maasai Mara, the top scavengers were the considerably to slightly heavier mammals, i.e. spotted hyenas (Crocuta croctua), black-backed jackals (Canis mesomelas) and feral dogs (Canis lupus familiaris), then the lappet-faced vulture (Torgos tracheliotos), the Rüppell's griffon (Gyps rueppellii), followed by all other vultures with the tawny eagle and the bateleur in the second most and the most subordinate scavenger positions. Similar scavenger hierarchies have been reported elsewhere as well. Bateleurs were the most likely to first find a carcass of the Maasai Mara scavengers and both the tawny and bateleur were considered as scavengers with "low competitive ability and high search efficiency".

However, tawny eagles will at times be able to displace the smaller species of vulture such as hooded vultures (Necrosyrtes monachus) and Egyptian vultures (Neophron percnopterus), both of which are similar in weight to the tawny eagles themselves, with one tawny eagle even reportedly keeping as many as 20 vultures at bay at a carcass. In general, based on the literature, such an event of aggressiveness by this species at a large carcass would surely be unusual. Tawny eagles do tend to be dominant over bateleur at carcasses, however. Gyps or griffon vultures are usually the most numerous vultures in attendance at carrion and are considerably larger than tawny eagles but sometimes may briefly tolerate a tawny eagle to feed in their midst depending on the circumstances. Usually, the larger the group is of griffon vultures, the less likely the tawny eagle is to get to feed. The eagles not infrequently remain on the periphery of the vulture feeding frenzy and wait for pieces of flesh to appear. Often they will be able to pick up small scraps but will wait until the carcass is finished and few vultures remain to feed. The tawny eagle can benefit from leading other scavengers to carrion or feeding subsequently to them since, unlike the largest and most aggressive vultures, such as lappet-faced vultures and cinereous vultures (Aegypius monachus), the tawny eagle cannot tear open large carcasses on their own and tend rely on another source to access any bits of the nutritious viscera. The tawny eagles when finding an unopened large carcass have few feeding options although may eat the eyes in such circumstances, as was verified in the circumstance of a tawny eagle finding a horse (Equus ferus caballus) carcass offered by researchers. Roadkills are another feeding option as they are often torn asunder by impact with automobiles and the eagle may be able to (at least briefly) monopolize the carcass. Perhaps not coincidentally, in Maasai Mara, the tawny eagles were found to benefit from a carcass being nearer human habitations and in lower quality habitats relative to the other scavengers. In particularly in India, scavenging tawny eagles tend to regularly occur at landfills where vultures seldom come but wintering steppe eagles may often feed alongside them seasonally. Garbage dumps are also visited in different parts of Africa such as Uganda and Ethiopia by hungry tawny eagles. Semi-predaceous and aggressively disposed vultures, like white-headed vultures (Trigonoceps occipitalis) in Africa and red-headed vultures (Sacrogyps calvus) in India as well as the lappet-faced and cinereous vultures, tend to have little tolerance for tawny eagles, with the latter unlikely to approach until these aggressive vultures have had their fill. On the contrary, though, at times white-headed vultures and tawny eagles have been observed peaceably sharing roadkills in some instances. Often tawny eagles will come to smaller carcasses of almost any animal, as will other smaller scavengers like bateleurs and hooded vultures as well as crows, perhaps merely to avoid the competition that often occurs at large carcasses. One subadult tawny eagle was observed to be following a pack of African wild dogs (Lycaon pictus), almost certainly in order to scavenge off of their kills.

=== Kleptoparasitism ===
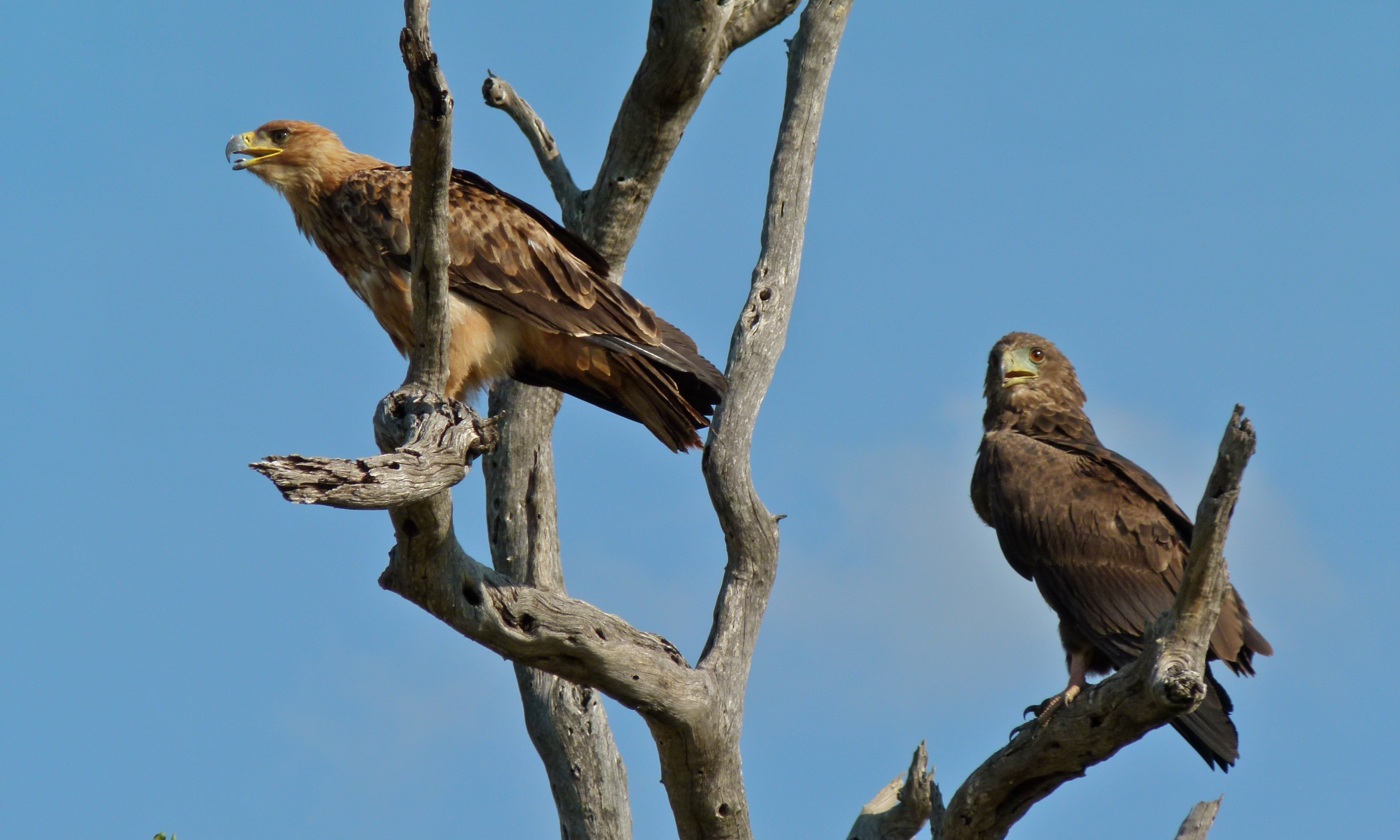
A tawny eagle perched with a young bateleur. The ecology of these species is often broadly similar but the tawny eagle usually dominates the bateleur in food competition.

The tawny eagle steals food from other raptors in addition to catching its own prey and coming to previously dead food sources. The Afrikaans name for the tawny eagle is a "Roofarend", meaning the "Robber Eagle". This behaviour is not entirely segregated from their scavenging on carrion behaviours but the considerable aggressiveness and boldness of the eagles in this circumstances are very different from their rather retiring disposition in scavenging contexts. At times the tawny eagle is considered "fearless" in their piratical attacks and is certain to engage in them more frequently than almost any other member of the booted eagle clan or perhaps even birds of prey. Other related eagles like the steppe eagle and eastern imperial eagle, as well as most sea eagles, can be locally regular kleptoparasites but tawny eagles rob prey from other birds with some regularity in every part of the range. Amongst all birds, only a few types of seabird such as skuas and frigatebirds are likely to derive a majority of their subsistence from kleptoparasitism. Generally, tawny eagles will surprise other birds of prey with a dashing stoop and yank away the prey item in a manner of seconds; they will seldom completely land if the prey item is intercepted on the ground so they can take off with the plundered item quickly. The size of birds that the tawny eagles have been known to pirate food away from have ranged from species as small as black-winged kites (Elanus caeruleus) and common kestrels (Falco tinnunculus) to those as large as a lammergeier (Gypaetus barbatus). There seems to few limits to the raptorial birds that the tawny eagle will not pirate from given the opportunity. In one case, a pair of tawny eagles descended on a secretarybird (Sagittarius serpentarius) that had killed a large puff adder and displaced both the secretarybird and an African harrier-hawk (Polyboroides typus) that had tried to enter the fray, after which the eagle pair split the adder between them. Other raptors known to be attacked for piracy in well-known and often repeated instances have included dark chanting goshawks (Melierax metabates), bateleurs, lanner falcons (Falco biarmicus) and even the imposing martial eagles (Polemaetus bellicosus) and Verreaux's eagles, the latter eagles having appeared to offer surprisingly little to no contest the tawny eagle's piracy despite their great strength and formidable talons. Carnivorous birds that are not traditionally considered raptorial birds, such as marabou storks and southern ground hornbills (Bucorvus leadbeateri), are also occasionally kleptoparasitized by tawny eagles. Interspecific piracy may be most frequent on bateleur despite that species being similarly sized and powered as the tawny eagle. While 5 displacements of tawny eagles by bateleur were reported in a study on their interactions, 26 instances of tawny eagles displacing bateleurs were described, clearly far more. Several smaller birds of prey were observed to be repeatedly robbed of their catches at a red-billed quelea colony, including queleas crippled but not killed by lanner falcons, although some of the maimed queleas were contested by jackals as well.

On occasion, a tawny eagle will find itself on the losing end of a kleptoparasitic interaction. Somewhat larger eagles have been seen to displace tawny eagles off of prey. These include African fish eagles (Haliaeetus vociferus), eastern imperial eagles and their cousins, steppe eagles. African fish eagles and Pallas's fish eagles (Haliaeetus leucoryphus) in India both seem to take precedence over tawny eagles at shared feeding sources such as carrion sites and water bird nesting colonies. In the Bale Mountains of Ethiopia, golden eagles appear to engage in displacement of and may dominate the much smaller tawny eagles. As aforementioned, a bateleur can succeed in seldom instances in pirating tawny eagles. Vultures, especially lappet-faced vultures, may assert themselves at recent tawny eagle kills and certainly can displace the eagles in some circumstances; it is likely but not confirmed that jackals may too opportunistically rob eagles as they have been recorded doing with other eagles. Large kills, which can not infrequently include prey of up to twice the eagle's own weight, are beyond the tawny eagle's ability for wing loading. Such kills are probably frequently lost to other carnivores. In Ethiopia, Ethiopian wolves (Canis simensis) were seen to rob tawny eagles repeatedly of freshly-caught rodents, succeeding in 5 of 21 attempts to do so. Even much smaller birds such as house crows (Corvus splendens) have been seen to successfully rob a tawny eagle of its prey.

=== Interspecific predatory relationship ===
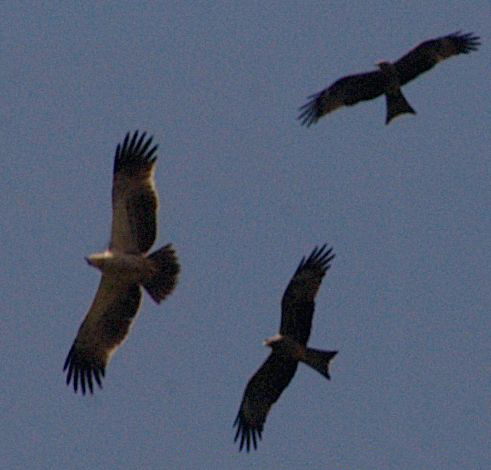
A tawny eagle in India flies with two black kites.

The tawny eagle occurrence in Africa and the Indian subcontinent places it in arguably two of the most competitive environments for birds of prey in the world. In turn, the tawny eagle seems to adapt via a lack of specialization on any particular prey type, hunting style or food source, and via including carrion in the diet quite often. Many other raptors and eagles overlap in habitat use with tawny eagles. However, wintering and residential Aquila and spotted eagles that bear some relation usually use slightly differing habitats in contrast to the tawny eagle. In Tsavo East National Park, the ecology of this eagle was studied at length in contrast to bateleurs and much larger martial eagles, which can appear to have broadly similar habitat and prey preferences, as well as the slightly smaller but larger-clawed African hawk eagles, which tends to habituate to slightly more wooded dry areas. In general within this study, all four eagle species derived a majority of their prey biomass from Kirk's dik-dik but that the martial eagles tended to take slightly larger dik-diks than the bateleur and tawny eagles, took slightly more in the park per pair based on annual estimates and were more unlikely to scavenge the prey while the African hawk-eagle tends to take younger dik-diks. The diet of the tawny eagle and bateleur in Tsavo East overlapped by around 64%, whereas the diet of the tawny and martial eagles only overlapped by 29%. The tawny eagle was the only eagle here to heavily supplement their diet with alternate prey like snakes, although bateleurs also took a wide range of prey. The Tsavo East study further indicated that the predatory pressure on dik-diks is mitigated temporally by the slightly staggered nesting seasons of each eagle, with bateleurs tending to nest rather earlier, the hawk-eagle slightly later, so the peak reliance on the prey did not generally overlap. Furthermore, habitat differs, with the African hawk-eagle foraging in more wooded areas while the bateleur can forage in more open, treeless areas than tawny eagles because the bateleur is an aerial hunter while the tawny eagle typically requires perches to hunt from. Further study has indicated that, in Africa, the bateleur broadly mirrors the tawny eagle in most respects of ecology. One stark difference from virtually any other known eagle is the tawny eagle's nesting habits. That is that this eagle nests almost invariably on the top of the canopy of a tree, rather than a main trunk or large sturdy branch of trees (or on cliffs or, in steppe eagles, the ground). The nesting location of tawny eagles runs more parallel to those of vultures. Study in Kruger National Park has shown that the tawny eagle and white-backed vulture (Gyps africanus) will freely nest in the treetop nest built by the other species. Furthermore, other species, including large owls and snake eagles, will use old nests built by tawny eagles. Although the habitats used by martial and tawny eagles have been reported as broadly similar, detailed study in the Karoo found that the tawny species preferred areas with higher and more predictable summer rainfall and with higher primary productivity than the martial.

Opportunistically, the tawny eagle may prey upon smaller birds of prey but this is fairly infrequent and the capture of raptorial birds has thus far been seldom reported. A hungry or food-gathering male tawny eagle may infrequently plunder the nests of other raptorial birds. Incautious, injured or distracted birds of prey may too be vulnerable to being killed as well. Diurnal birds of prey known to be preyed upon by tawny eagle in Africa have included black-winged kites, hooded vultures, pale chanting goshawks (Melierax canorus) and African pygmy falcons (Polihierax semitorquatus). In India, the tawny eagle has been known to prey upon western marsh harriers (Circus aeruginosus), shikras (Accipiter badius) and white-eyed buzzards (Butastur teesa). Owls are apparently fairly vulnerable to tawny eagle predation. Species that they have been known to prey on are barn owls (Tyto alba), spotted eagle-owls (Bubo africanus), little owls (Athene noctua), pearl-spotted owlets (Glaucidium perlatum) and marsh owls (Asio capensis). The fresh remains of a secretarybird were found in one tawny eagle nest in Africa but, if the eagles killed the bird rather than scavenged it, this would need confirmation. The tawny eagle, despite being an eagle of intermediate size, does not seem to be subject to natural predators in adulthood as far as is known and can be said to fulfill the role of an apex predator. Nestling tawny eaglets and young tawny eagles are commonly vulnerable to assorted natural predators but these are little known. A partial list of probable nest predators are likely corvids, snakes and carnivores capable of climbing. One confirmed predator of nestling tawny eagles is the honey badger (Mellivora capensis).

== Breeding biology ==
=== Pairing and Territories ===
The tawny eagle often seems to pair for life. Like most birds of prey, they are quite territorial towards conspecifics. The commonest display is single or mutual high circling or soaring often in wide spiral. Males will sometimes dive and stoop repeatedly around the female, though she does not usually respond by turning over. Pairs may engage in the display each year to strengthen pair bonds. Occasionally two tawny eagles will interlocks talons to descend rapidly, cartwheeling down 30 m or more within a few seconds, sometimes disengaging just before the ground. In other related eagles of the Aquilinae subfamily, cartwheeling interactions are usually considered to be aggressive fights between a territorial eagle and an intruder of the same sex. Prior studies thought this to be the case for the tawny eagle, with an estimated 82% of cartwheeling instances thought to be aggressive, 11% for courtship and 7% for apparent play. However, through closer observations evidence has been made of frequent cartwheeling between males and females as a regular part of the courtship display. Undulating sky dances are sometimes performed too by males with a series of descents and upward swoops on partially close wings, accompanied by calling. However, instances of this seem to be rare. In one instance, two males appeared to engage in a display for a single female. Per one author's opinion the aerial displays of the tawny eagle are "not particularly spectacular compared to other eagles". The breeding season tends to fall in March to August in northeastern Africa, October to June in west Africa and in almost all months of the year but in central, east and southern Africa, but mainly from May to November in Kenya and April to January in central and southern Africa. In India, the breeding season is usually November to May, but occasionally can vary from any time from October to August. Mating generally occurs in and around the nest vicinity. The density very variable on the African continent overall of breeding pair which were estimated to occupy about 75 to 300 km^{2} (29 to 116 sq mi) each. Zimbabwe nest spacing was found to be 7 to 10 km (4.3 to 6.2 mi) in one study. On the border of Kruger National Park, 7 pairs found in a 460 km^{2} (180 sq mi) area but in regular spaced pylon nests in western Transvaal, nests were 19 to 20 km (12 to 12 mi) apart. In Hwange National Park, over 11 years of study, 92 pairs on were found to be nesting over basalt in a 4,724 km^{2} (1,824 sq mi) area while 84 pairs on Kalahari sands in a 9,876 km^{2} (3,813 sq mi) area. Mean nest distances on basalt were around 4 km (2.5 mi) while on sands it was around 59 km (37 mi). In Zambia, the nesting density was considered high for the species at a pair per 28 km^{2} (11 sq mi).

=== Nest ===
The nests of the tawny eagle are large platforms, composed of sticks but sometimes incorporating animal bones. Nesting sites tend to be open to the sky, in flat, open or hilly country, and offer a commanding, good view of the surrounding country. The sites are not infrequently close to watering holes and, more so in India, close to villages. Nests are usually 6 to 15 m (20 to 49 ft) above the ground, though seldom can be up to 30 m (98 ft) high. Nests are located at the top crown of the tree and only very rarely are placed beneath the canopy or on a lateral branch. In Kenya, tawny eagles showed no nesting preference according to tree height or spatial distribution of trees; however, they preferred Euphorbia, Boscia and Euclea tree species. In India, commonly used trees used in the northern areas are Ficus religiosa, Dalbergia sissoo and mango trees while in the arid Kutch and western Rajasthan areas they often nest in rather stunted Vachellia nilotica and Prosopis chilensis (i.e. usually the nests here are 4 to 6 m (13 to 20 ft) high but are sometimes down to 4 m (13 ft) ). Trees are usually selected that have prickly branches, presumably for protection. Despite their prominent position in the trees, the nests can be surprisingly hard to perceive peering from the ground level. In Kgalagadi Transfrontier Park, South Africa, tawny eagles build nests that are positioned in the canopy of large Vachellia erioloba trees. These Kgalagadi pairs tend to be the largest and tallest trees, averaging at 10.9 m (36 ft). Tawny eagles in India reportedly often nest in a tree over successive years, but the species is threatened by the lopping and cutting of all remaining suitable trees for fuel and fodder. Tawny eagles in Kgalagadi Transfrontier Park, on the other hand, build new nests yearly and only 2% of nests are reused for breeding purposes the following year. Potential risk of collapse and growth of branches around the nest are thought to be factors limiting nest reuses in Africa. Usually new nests are not more than 2 km (1.2 mi) away from the prior nest. Both sexes participate in nest building and the repair of a nest takes up to 4 to 7 weeks, though most of the construction can be completed within about a week. For an eagle, their nests are relatively wide, flat and shallow. Nests may measure just under 1 m (3.3 ft) in diameter and 20 cm (7.9 in) deep but can easily reach over 1.3 m (4.3 ft) and 30 cm (12 in) with repeated uses. Nests are usually lined with grass, leaves, seedpods and fur as well as odd objects such as newspapers, paper packets and polythene bags. In Kruger National Park, tawny eagles have been recorded using nests of other species of raptor such as white-backed vulture and white-headed vulture. At times, tawny eagles have been known to nest on top of the large communal nests of the white-headed buffalo weaver (Dinemellia dinemelli). In the Central Karoo region of South Africa, tawny eagles build their nests in large electric transmission towers. Populations of large eagles like the martial eagle and Verreaux's eagle have been recorded breeding on these power pylons since the 1970s. Between 2002 and 2003, 39% of electrical faults recorded on transmission lines were due to large eagle nests. As a result, problem nests were dismantled and rebuilt below the electrical conductors.

=== Eggs ===
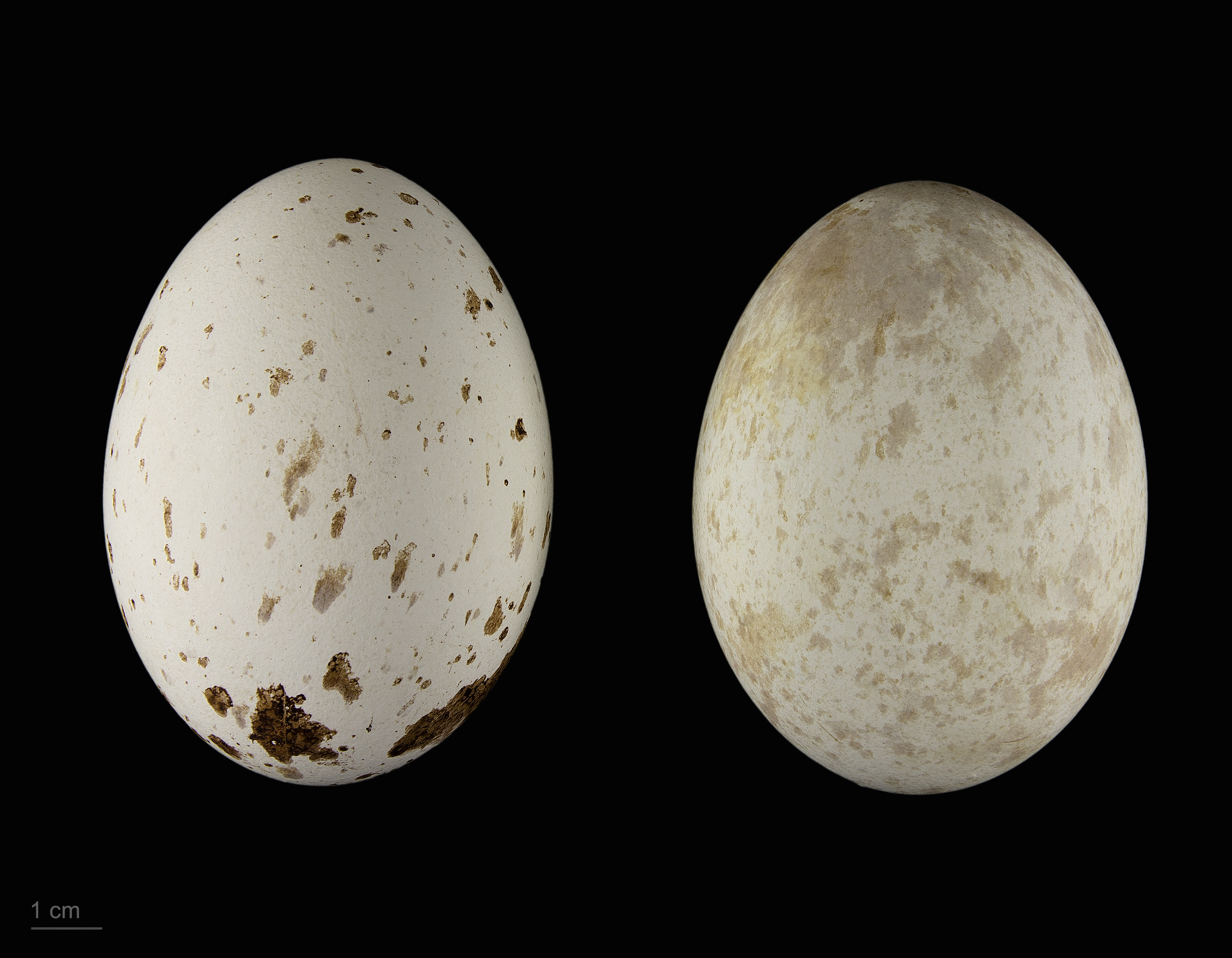
Aquila rapax – MHNT

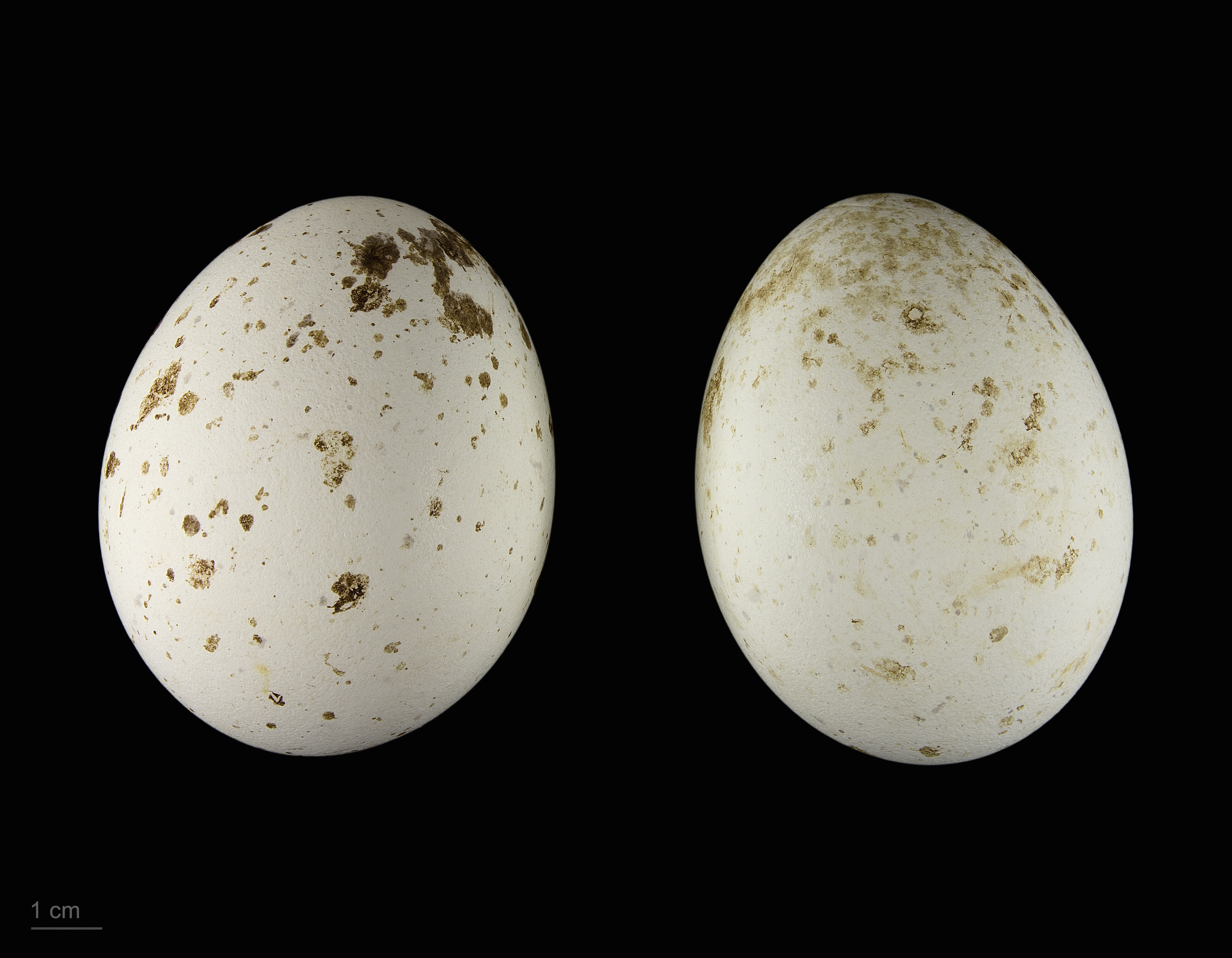
Aquila rapax belisarius – MHNT

Eggs are laid at intervals of several days, mainly timed to the dry season but at times also in the wet season. Evidence from the Kalahari Desert shows that egg-laying is timed to exploit a number of food resources with warmer weather in sync with young in the nest, such as various small mammals and the springbok (Antidorcas marsupialis) lambing season. In India, intervals were more prolonged when the habitat was less optimal. Of 26 tawny eagle nests monitored between 1988 and 1996 in the Kgalagadi Transfrontier Park, 84.6% of the laying dates occurred between May and June. These laying dates are similar to populations in Zambia, Zimbabwe and the Maasai Mara region in Kenya as well as elsewhere in southern and southeastern Africa. Cases of eggs being laid in southern Africa in July and August may be cases of replacement clutches. Incidental data on laying phenology from north and West Africa shows the tawny eagles of the area lay eggs usually in the earlier part of the year, i.e. January to April; in Ghana egg-laying may range from October to February, though largely is in December–January; November–February egg-laying occurred in Ethiopia and apparently around April in Morocco. Showing the variation in India, in Punjab, Uttar Pradesh and Bihar, tawny eagles are mainly laying eggs in January while in Kutch and Jaisalmer, the young are already leaving the nests. Clutch sizes range from 1 to 3 eggs per nest, but average 1.7 eggs per clutch. In drier years in Hwange National Park, clutch sizes appear to become reduced. The eggs are white but variously and usually faintly marked with brown, varying from unmarked sometimes to quite well-marked with spots and blotches of reddish brown. In 67 eggs of the nominate subspecies, the eggs were 64 to 75.7 mm (2.52 to 2.98 in) in height by 49.9 to 60 mm (1.96 to 2.36 in) in diameter, with an average of 69.6 mm × 54.8 mm (2.74 in × 2.16 in) in the sample while another 30 from the same race averaged 71.5 mm × 56.3 mm (2.81 in × 2.22 in). In A. r. vindhiana, 80 eggs measured from 58 to 75.1 mm (2.28 to 2.96 in) by 46.4 to 57.6 mm (1.83 to 2.27 in), with an average of 66 mm × 52.8 mm (2.60 in × 2.08 in).

=== Development of young and parental behaviour ===
Eggs are incubated by the female for 40–44 days, with extreme records of 30 to 45 days, before hatching. Incubation tends to begin with the first egg and may be done exclusively by the female in India but, in African data, the male sometimes briefly relieves her. When the nests are climbed up to, the females are tight sitters, often flying at the very last minute. Green lining may still be added at the incubation stage. Upon hatching, the young apparently have to be constantly brooded or shaded from strong sun in the very open nests. The chicks are initially covered with white down, with a black bill, yellow cere and feet and brown eyes; a thicker white coat is acquired at 2 weeks and 1 week later the 1st feathers appear on scapulars and wing coverts. The young eaglets can stand weakly at about 3 weeks, walk around the nest at 4 weeks and start to wing-flap about a week later. Wing and tail quills sprout rapidly, with feathers appearing down the side of the breast at 4 weeks. By 5 weeks, feathers cover much of the body except for the head and underparts. By week 7, the chick has only a small amount of down feathers remaining and weighs around 2.15 kg (4.7 lb). The rapid development of dorsal feathers is comparable to other raptors that use open nest sites such as snake eagles and secretarybirds. Only one chick usually survives after hatching. This is often due to siblicide, where the older chick fatally wounds the younger chick in the first few days of life. The older sibling weighs around 143 g (5.0 oz) while the younger one weighs about 85 g (3.0 oz) frequently at the point of its demise or disappearance. In southern Africa, there are at least four cases of two fledglings occurring in one nest, however. At around 5 weeks, the eaglet adopts anti-predator behaviours, some laying prone while a novel animal approaches while others adopt a truculent threat posture with feathers raised, gape opened, wings poised to slap and talons barred for slashing. For the first 10 days, the adult female observes the chick very closely, relying on food provisioned by the male. After two weeks, the chick is left alone for 2.5 hours each day, whilst the adults forage. At this point the male may start making direct food deliveries to the eaglet. This is considered a relatively early point to stop attending to the nest for an eagle this size and the nest often soon becomes unsuitably foul with remains. One 39-day-old eaglet was able to tear up its own food already but was still primarily fed by the female. The first flight attempts are around 7–10 weeks but the chick is fully grown and capable of fledging the nest fully after 10–12 weeks. However, the female may remain to shelter during rainstorms around to as late as the fledging stage. The full stage of dependence is ongoing for about 6 weeks after fledging. The young tawny eagle may stay with the parents even until next breeding season. In India at least, after the nesting period, the pairs disperse and leave the nesting area, seldom being seen near the nest until pairing off again initiates in October. A juvenile tawny eagle that was shot at 2 years old was 48 km (30 mi) away from its original nest while 2 juveniles at 5 months and 7 months old were 50 and 34 km (31 and 21 mi) away, respectively.

=== Nesting success and failures ===
Nest losses of eggs and young appears to be quite high. Young eaglets often die, at times by their siblings, and if poorly guarded nests are often predated by a probably wide range of predators. Nesting success is driven by quality of habitats and food access. Breeding efforts in Zimbabwe produced 19 young in 26 pair years with a replacement rate of 0.73 young per pair per year. In India, tawny eagles pairs seem to adapt to suboptimal overly sandy habitats by more dispersing nests, and can show similar productivity of chicks per nest as a result. In Hwange National Park, 72.4% of pairs present were thought to breed on average in the course of a year, with an average of 0.61 fledglings produced per effort. This is and other studies support that rainfall is key to productive success in tawny eagles of this area, with far more two egg clutches rather than one egg ones (which usually failed) and less confined breeding periods in years that had greater rainfall. Breeding success, recorded as young per pair per year (ypy), was lower still in Namibia and Tsavo East National Park than in Zimbabwe (0.4, 0.5 and 0.78 ypy respectively). Higher nesting success was found in Zambia, where pair produced a mean of 1 fledgling per nest. Although an extensive study of lifespan are not known to have taken place for the tawny eagle, it is known that these eagles can live up to at least 16 years of age in the wild.

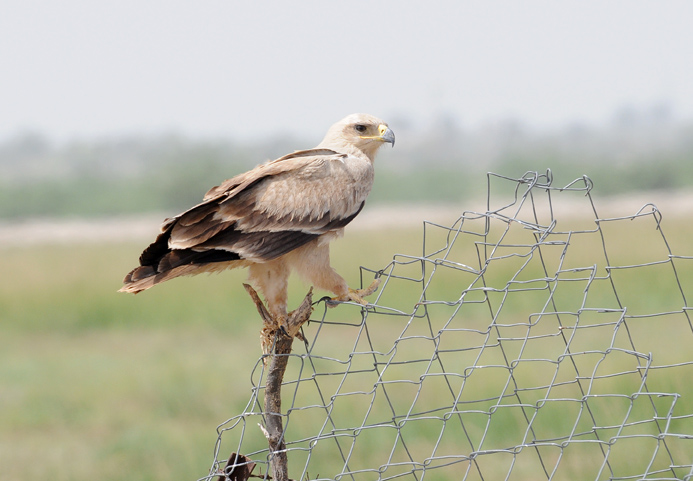
An unusually light juvenile tawny eagle from India.

== Status ==
=== Conservation ===
The tawny eagle still occupies a large range. In Africa, it has been estimated that the range of the species covers about 15 million square kilometers, in addition to a range of about 3.1 million square kilometers in Asia. As recently as the 1990s, the global population was thought to possibly range into six figures with a population in Asia at that time thought to be in the hundreds of thousands alone. However, the species is currently listed as Vulnerable on the IUCN list of Threatened species. The current population is far less than half of what it was once thought to be, with only about 100,000 to just under 500,000 individuals thought to persist worldwide. There was a clear decrease in tawny eagle sightings between SABAP and SABAP2 in Southern Africa, occurring in only 323 of 1440 quarter degree grid cells. During close study of the tawny and martial eagle in central Namibia, a precipitous decline was detected in both, with a tawny eagle population that was once regionally numbered about 19 pairs down to 2 known pairs. The once seemingly innumerous population of this species within Kgalagadi Transfrontier Park was known by the 1990s to be down to merely 40 known pairs. Roadside counts conducted in Mali, Niger and Burkina Faso show that although the majority of raptor species are in drastic population decline, only the tawny eagle and snake eagles are surviving outside of protected areas. In India, the tawny eagle was once considered "our commonest eagle" but strong declines have been detected with surveys indicating strongholds like Rajasthan have shown reductions of observed pairs by up to half. According to the producer-scrounger foraging theory, vultures are to some extent reliant on tawny eagles to help locate carcasses. Thus, the conservation of eagles outside protected areas is of vital importance to ensure the survival of vultures.

=== Threats ===
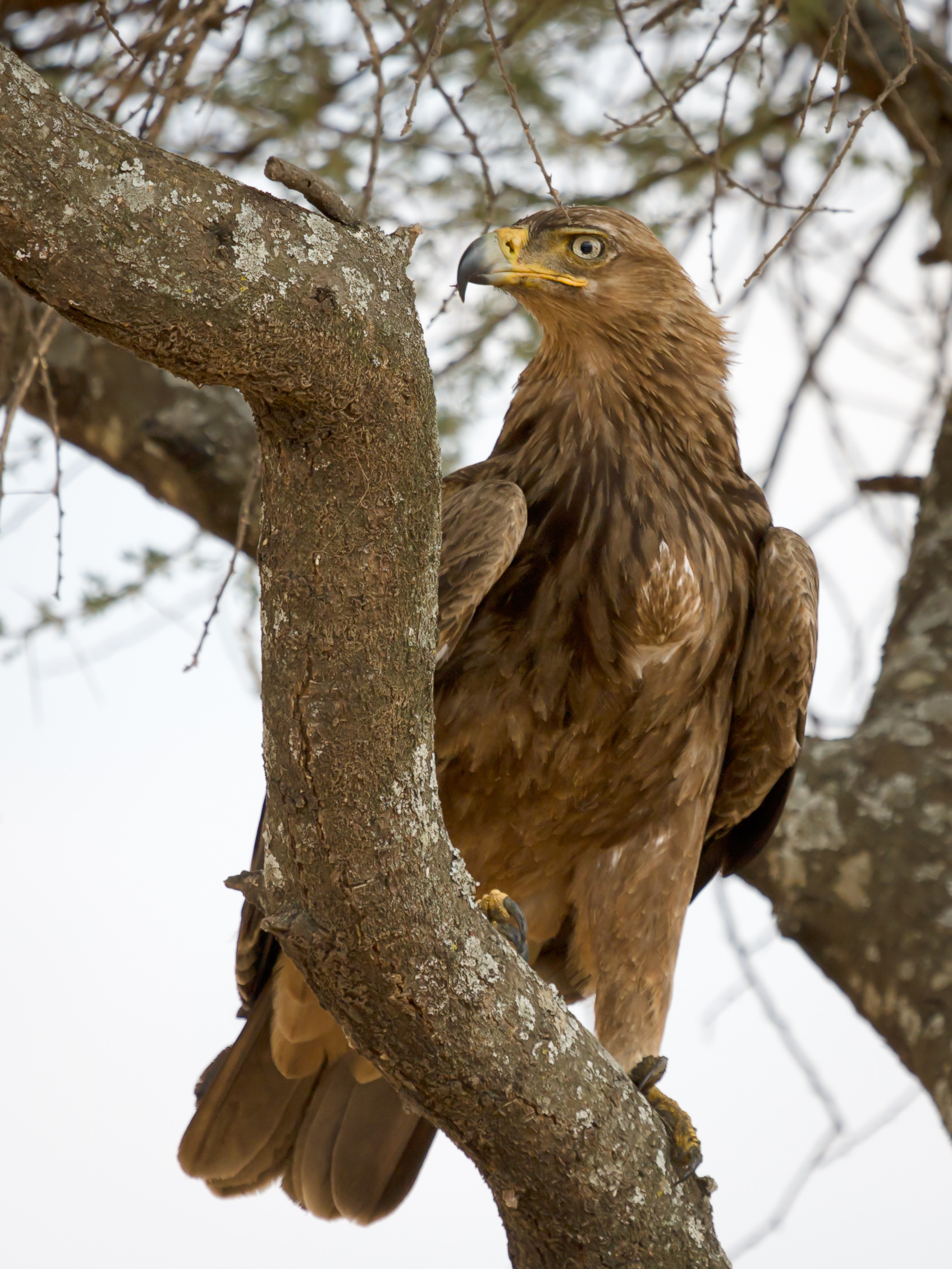
A tawny eagle in the Serengeti.

Tawny eagles face a number of threats that affect their breeding behaviour, foraging success and ultimately the survival of individual birds. The most recent and devastating threat to survival occurred on 20 June 2019. The carcasses of 468 white-backed vultures, 17 white-headed vultures, 28 hooded vultures, 14 lappet-faced vultures and 10 cape vultures were found alongside 2 tawny eagles. A total of 537 vultures and 2 eagles were found poisoned in northern Botswana. It is suspected that they died after eating the carcasses of 3 elephants that were laced with poison by poachers. Carcasses are poisoned to ensure that scavengers are unable to aid rangers in the effort to locate poached wildlife. By circling above dead animals, large raptors act as an early detection system for anti-poaching rangers. Poisoning events are far from restricted to Botswana and are thought to be a direct factor in the reduction of tawny eagles as well even in the protected areas of Kruger National Park. In central Namibia, all 5 of the juvenile tawny eagles that were radio-tagged were poisoned by strychnine baits, completely decimating all recruitment of the species in the area. Mysteriously, the populations of bateleurs and tawny eagles in the Maasai Mara appear to be bumping up as opposed to the declines reported elsewhere, seemingly in sync with the worsening declines of vultures on the Maasai.

Further threats to tawny eagles include habitat loss and land-use changes such as intensified cattle grazing, firewood collection and sale and the charcoal industry. Such culling of the spare trees of arid India seem to be the primary driver of less understand decline of tawny eagles in India. A seemingly higher instance of bacterial infections also seems to affecting the tawny eagles of India. Raptor populations are reliant on seasonal rainfall events which influence the survival of prey populations. Climate change is alternating rainfall patterns in the arid regions of Southern Africa and impacting on prey populations. There is a clear correlation between rainfall events and breeding success of tawny eagles. It was found that the projected decline of tawny eagles from climate change, which is already underway, begun via impact population persistence, first effecting population dynamics, the composition of biological communities and finally biodiversity. Electrocutions and collision risks associated with overhead power lines remain a constant threat to large eagles and vultures. Furthermore, the powerline nesting raptors were found to be a significant source of line faulting in the area, causing substantial financial issues. Occasionally, tawny eagles are also killed by flying into various manmade objects such as reservoirs or are killed by automobiles and are at risk at wind turbines in India. The overarching threat to any raptor population is human population increase which causes competition for habitat and food resources. Key to conservation of the tawny eagle population is mitigating the effects of global warming. Also, clearly, the banning of poison baits and the mitigation of dangerous powerlines in eagle-utilized areas is key for the survival of the tawny eagles.
