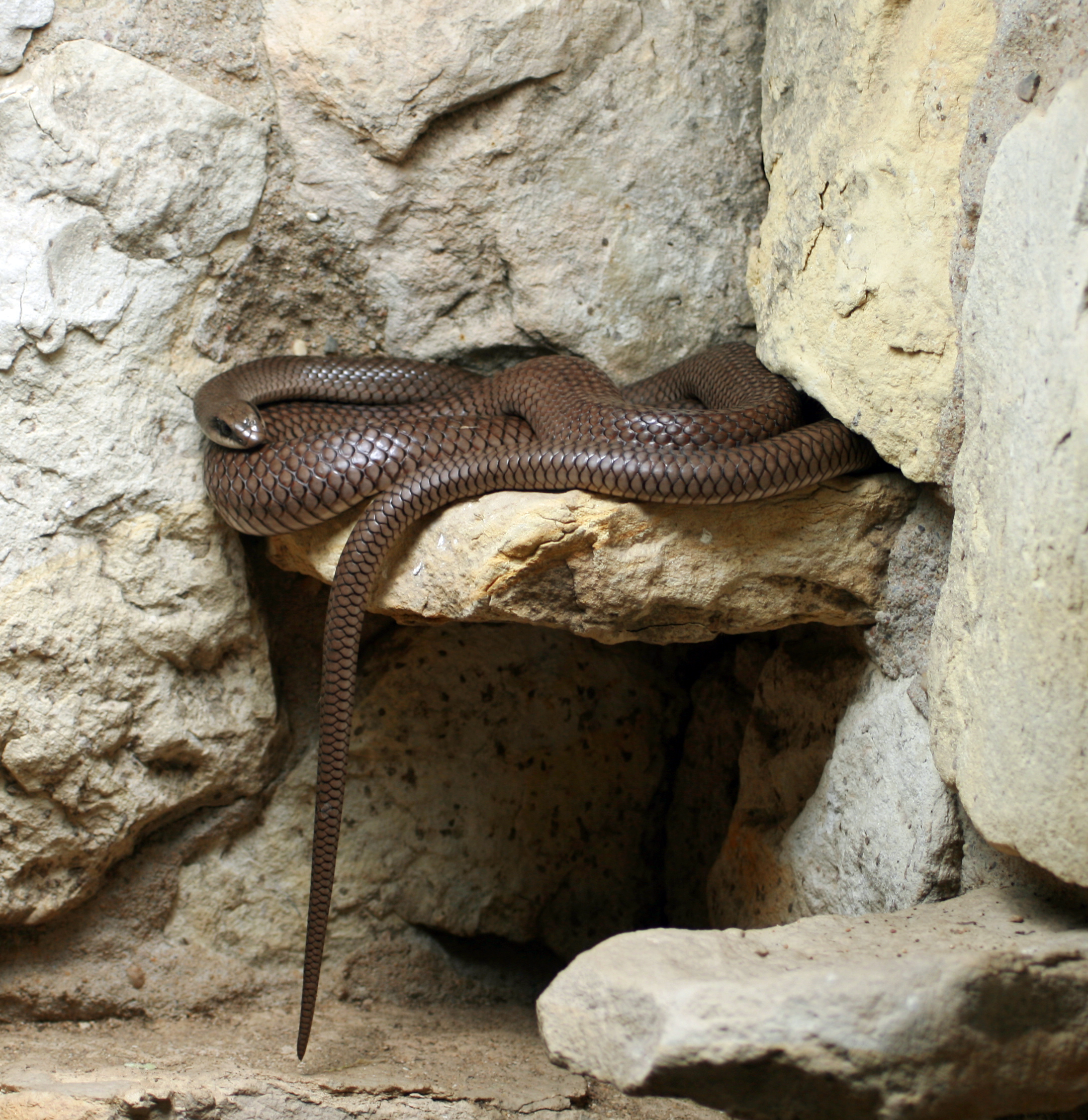
- Rhamphiophis rostratus

Scientific classification
- Kingdom: Animalia
- Phylum: Chordata
- Class: Reptilia
- Order: Squamata
- Suborder: Serpentes
- Family: Psammophiidae
- Genus: Rhamphiophis; Peters, 1854

Type species
- Rhamphiophis rostratus Peters, 1854

Species
- R. maradiensis Chirio & Ineich, 1991; R. oxyrhynchus (Reinhardt, 1843); R. rostratus Peters, 1854; R. rubropunctatus (Fischer, 1884)

= Rhamphiophis =

Genus of snakes

Rhamphiophis is a genus of snakes of the family Psammophiidae.

== Species ==
This genus includes the following species:

- Rhamphiophis maradiensis Chirio & Ineich, 1991
- Rhamphiophis oxyrhynchus (Reinhardt, 1843)
- Rhamphiophis rostratus Peters, 1854
- Rhamphiophis rubropunctatus (Fischer, 1884)

Species formerly placed in this genus include:

- Rhamphiophis acutus (Günther, 1888) – now Psammophylax acutus Günther, 1888
