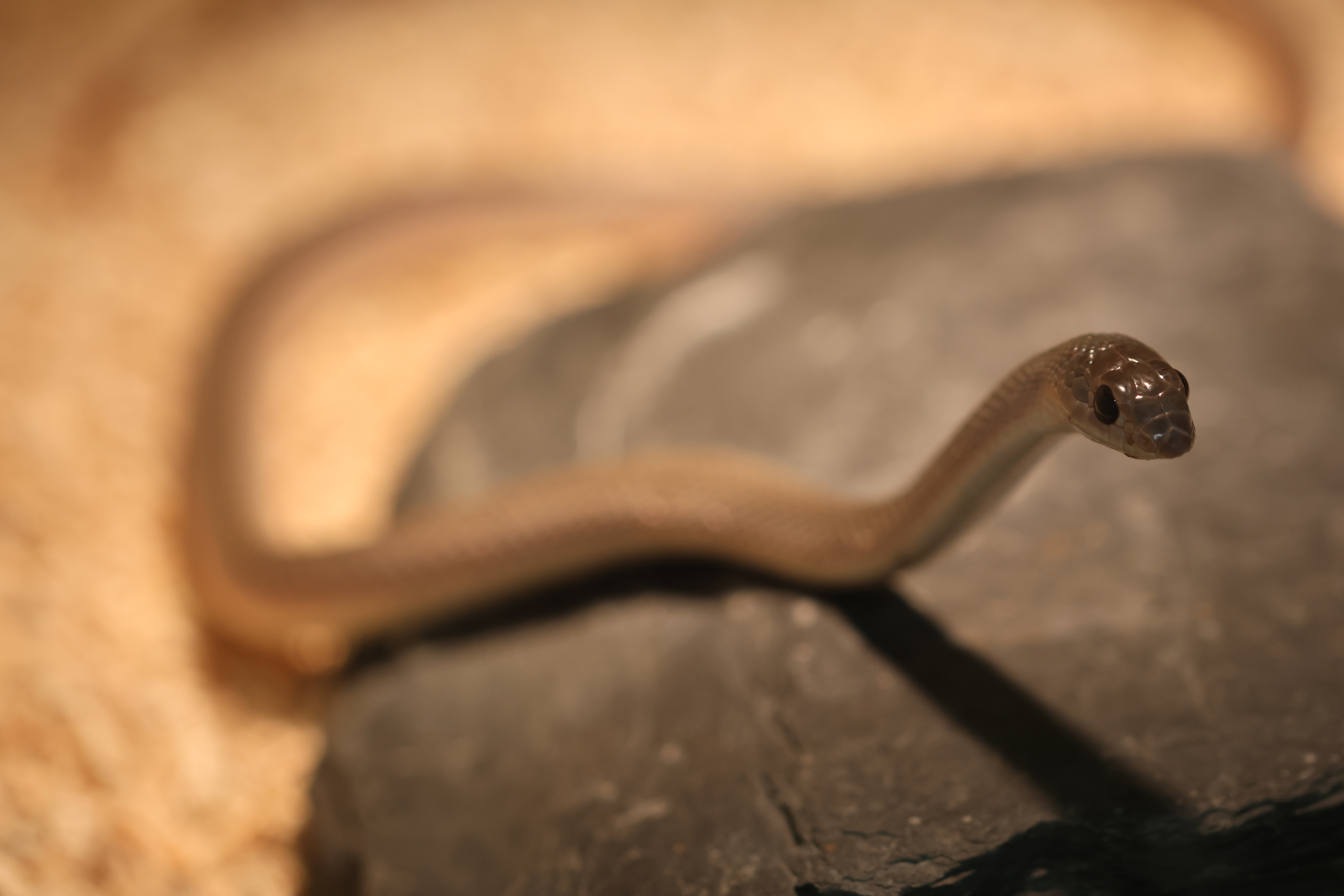
- Specimen from the Prague Zoo

Conservation status
- Least Concern (IUCN 3.1)

Scientific classification
- Kingdom: Animalia
- Phylum: Chordata
- Class: Reptilia
- Order: Squamata
- Suborder: Serpentes
- Family: Psammophiidae
- Genus: Rhamphiophis
- Species: R. oxyrhynchus

Binomial name
- Rhamphiophis oxyrhynchus (J.T. Reinhardt, 1843)

Synonyms
- Psammophis oxyrhynchus J.T. Reinhardt, 1843; Rhamphiophis oxyrhynchus – W. Peters, 1854; Coelopeltis oxyrhynchus – Jan, 1863; Rhagerrhis oxyrhynchus – Günther, 1888; Rhamphiophis oxyrhynchus – Broadley, 1998

= Rhamphiophis oxyrhynchus =

Species of snake

Rhamphiophis oxyrhynchus is a species of mildly venomous snake in the family Psammophiidae. The species is native to East Africa. Its common name refers to its hooked snout, which it uses to dig burrows, and to its reddish-brown dorsal coloration. It hunts small animals during the day with the help of its venomous bite.

== Taxonomy ==
The two subspecies are R.o. oxyrhynchus (J.T. Reinhardt, 1843) and R.o. rostratus W. Peters, 1854. Some authorities consider the latter to be a species, R. rostratus W. Peters, 1854.

== Description ==
Rhamphiophis oxyrhynchus is large and stout, with males reaching a maximum length of 1.1 m (3.6 ft) and females reaching 1.07 m (3.5 ft). It has a shortened skull, as with all beaked snakes, giving it a clear distinction between its head and body, as well as a dark brown eye stripe running down the side of its head. Its eyes are large with round pupils. Its back ranges from grey to yellowish-brown to reddish-brown, and its belly is cream or yellowish-white.

== Geographic range ==
The range of Rhamphiophis oxyrhynchus includes north Botswana, north Zimbabwe, Zambia, Mozambique, Tanzania, Uganda, Kenya, South Sudan, and Sudan.

== Habitat ==
It primarily inhabits bushveld and thornveld (bushland) habitats.

== Biology ==
Diurnal animals, Rhamphiophis oxyrhynchus hunts small animals, including other snakes, but stays in burrows during the hottest part of the day. In the summer, females lay eight to 17 cylindrical eggs with dimensions of about 36 mm × 21 mm (1.42 in × 0.83 in) over the span of several days. The snake's venom, one of its components of which is a neurotoxin called rufoxin, causes hypotension and circulatory shock in small mammals, but is not dangerous to humans.
