= Adamowicz =

Adamowicz is a Polish surname; it may refer to:

- Adam Ferdynand Adamowicz (pl:Adam Ferdynand Adamowicz) (1802–1881), botanist, zoologist; author of the spotted eagle genus Clanga
- Adamowicz brothers Benjamin (born Bolesław) Adamowicz (1898–1979) and Joseph (born Józef) Adamowicz (1893–1970) Adamowicz, Poland-born American businessmen and amateur aviators known for their transatlantic flight in 1934
- Irena Adamowicz (1910–1973), Polish scout and resistance worker during World War II
- Katarzyna Adamowicz (born 1993), Polish chess player
- Laurent Adamowicz, French businessman, entrepreneur, lecturer, author, and public health advocate.
- Magdalena Adamowicz, (born 1973), Polish lawyer and the widow of Paweł Adamowicz
- Paweł Adamowicz (1965–2019), Polish politician, mayor of Gdańsk
- Tony Adamowicz (1941–2016), American racing driver
- Wacław Adamowicz (1905–1939), Polish footballer
