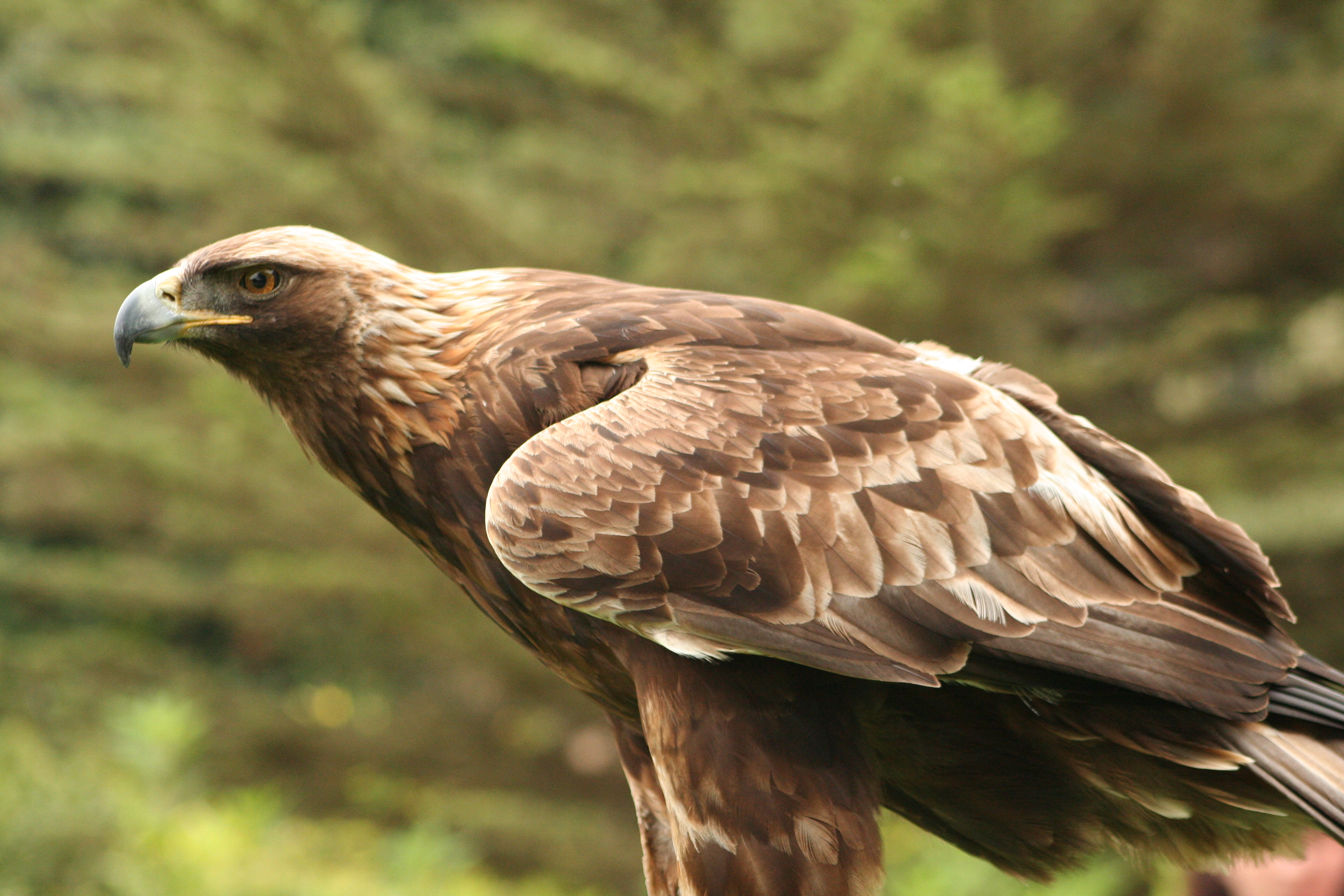
- Golden eagle (Aquila chrysaetos)

Scientific classification
- Kingdom: Animalia
- Phylum: Chordata
- Class: Aves
- Order: Accipitriformes
- Family: Accipitridae
- Subfamily: Aquilinae
- Genus: Aquila; Brisson, 1760

Type species
- Falco chrysaetos Linnaeus, 1758

Synonyms
- See text

= Aquila (bird) =

True eagles Temporal range: Middle Miocene to present

Genus of birds

3D scan of skeleton

Aquila is the genus of true eagles. The genus name is Latin for "eagle", possibly derived from aquilus, "dark in colour". It is often united with the sea eagles, buteos, and other more heavyset Accipitridae, but more recently they appear to be less distinct from the slenderer accipitrine hawks than previously believed. Eagles are not a natural group but denote essentially any bird of prey large enough to hunt sizeable (about 50 cm long or more overall) vertebrate prey.

== Taxonomy and systematics ==
The genus Aquila was introduced by the French zoologist Mathurin Jacques Brisson in 1760 with the golden eagle (Aquila chrysaetos) as the type species. Aquila belongs to a close-knit group of "typical" eagles including genera Hieraaetus, Lophaetus, Ictinaetus and Clanga. This group occurs as a clade within the larger group of "booted" eagles (tribe Aquilini or subfamily Aquilinae).

The plumage of the more basal members of the booted-eagle group, such as Spizaetus and Nisaetus, generally has barred underparts in adults, and is distinctly different in juveniles which have plain, pale underparts. In contrast, within the Aquila–Hieraaetus–Lophaetus clade, adults are generally dark, with juveniles more closely resembling the adults. Hieraaetus species have both dark and light (or "pied") morphs, with the latter having light, unbarred under-parts.

Research in molecular genetics found Aquila and Hieraaetus to be polyphyletic. Between 2005 and 2014, the British Ornithologists' Union included both Bonelli's and the booted eagle in Aquila. Also, Clements' Checklist merged all Hieraetus species into Aquila from 2001 to 2009. The current approach is to keep Hieraaetus as a separate genus, with Bonelli's eagle and the African hawk-eagle moved into Aquila and Wahlberg's eagle moved into Hieraaetus.

The spotted eagles greater spotted eagle, lesser spotted eagle, and Indian spotted eagle (previously Aquila clanga, A. pomarina, A. (p.) hastata) are thought to be genetically closer to Ictinaetus and Lophoaetus than to other Aquila species, and may be placed into a separate genus, Clanga.

Members of Aquila (excluding those moved to Clanga and Hieraaetus, but including A. fasciata / spilogaster) share two deletions in the (nuclear) LDH gene, as well as similarities in mitochondrial cyt-B gene sequence, though one of these deletions is reverted in A. chrysaetos.

A more recent molecular study by Catanach et al. (2024), which included ultra-conserved genetic elements, supported the existence of three clades: Hieraaetus (including H. wahlbergii), Aquila (including A. spilogaster and A. fasciata), and Lophaetus–Ictinaetus–Clanga. Within Aquila, two main clades were found: nipalensis–adalberti–heliaca–rapax, and audax–guerneyi–chrysaetos–verreauxii–spilogaster–fasciata, with A. africana diverging in between.

== Species ==
The genus Aquila contains 11 species:

Genus Aquila – Brisson, 1760 – eleven species
| Common name | Scientific name and subspecies | Range | Size and ecology | IUCN status and estimated population |
|---|---|---|---|---|
| Steppe eagle | Aquila nipalensis (Hodgson, 1833) | Romania east through the south Russian and Central Asian steppes to Mongolia | Size: Habitat: Diet: | EN 50,000 - 75,000 ▼ |
| Tawny eagle | Aquila rapax (Temminck, 1828) | Africa both north and south of the Sahara Desert and across tropical southwestern Asia to India. | Size: Habitat: Diet: | VU 100,000 - 499,999 ▼ |
| Spanish imperial eagle | Aquila adalberti C. L. Brehm, 1861 | central and south-west Spain and adjacent areas of Portugal, in the Iberian peninsula | Size: Habitat: Diet: | VU 1,060 - 1,080 ▲ |
| Eastern imperial eagle | Aquila heliaca Savigny, 1809 | northeastern Africa and southern and eastern Asia | Size: Habitat: Diet: | VU 2,500 - 9,999 ▼ |
| Wedge-tailed eagle | Aquila audax (Latham, 1801) | Australia, southern New Guinea, part of Papua New Guinea and Indonesia | Size: Habitat: Diet: | LC ▲ |
| Golden eagle | Aquila chrysaetos (Linnaeus, 1758) | Eurasia and North America | Size: Habitat: Diet: | LC 85,000 - 160,000 |
| Cassin's hawk-eagle | Aquila africana (Cassin, 1865) | West, central and marginally east Africa; from Sierra Leone east to western Uganda south through the Congo Basin to northern Angola | Size: Habitat: Diet: | LC 670 - 6,700 ▼ |
| Gurney's eagle | Aquila gurneyi Gray, 1860 | Moluccas to Irian Jaya and most of New Guinea | Size: Habitat: Diet: | NT 2,500 - 9,999 ▼ |
| Verreaux's eagle | Aquila verreauxii Lesson, 1830 | southern and eastern Africa (extending marginally into Chad), and very locally in West Africa, the Arabian Peninsula and the southern Middle East. | Size: Habitat: Diet: | LC |
| Bonelli's eagle | Aquila fasciata (Vieillot, 1822) | southern Europe, Africa both north and south of the Sahara Desert and across the Middle East and South Asia to Indonesia | Size: Habitat: Diet: | LC 20,000 - 49,999 ▼ |
| African hawk-eagle | Aquila spilogaster (Bonaparte, 1850) | tropical Sub-Saharan Africa | Size: Habitat: Diet: | LC ▼ |

=== Fossil record ===
Numerous fossil taxa of eagles have been described. Many have been moved to other genera, but several appear to be correctly assigned to this genus:

- Aquila bullockensis (Middle Miocene)
- ?Aquila delphinensis (Middle/Late Miocene of Grive-Saint-Alban, France)
- ?Aquila pennatoides (Middle/Late Miocene of Grive-Saint-Alban, France)
- Aquila sp. (Late Miocene – Late Pliocene of S Europe)
- Aquila sp. (Early Pliocene of Florida)
- Aquila bivia (Late Pliocene of S USA)
- Aquila kurochkini (Late Pliocene of Varshets, Bulgaria)
- Aquila sp. (Middle Pleistocene of Castiglione, Corsica)
- ?Aquila fossilis (Middle/Late Pleistocene of Monte Reale, Sardinia)
- Aquila nipaloides (Pleistocene of Sardinia and Corsica)
- ?Aquila sp. (Late Quaternary, Madagascar)

Whether "Hieraaetus" edwardsi (Middle -? Late Miocene of SW Europe) belongs into Aquila or the hawk-eagles (if the latter are indeed distinct) is unclear. Its initial name, "Aquila" minuta Milne-Edwards, 1871, is preoccupied by a junior synonym of the booted eagle, A. minuta Brehm, 1831.

Not placed in Aquila anymore are:

- "Aquila" gervaisii – now in Palaeohierax
- "Aquila" borrasi, "A." sodalis – now in Buteogallus, B. borrasi was long placed in Titanohierax.
- "Aquila" pliogryps – now in Spizaetus
- "Aquila" corroyi, "A." depredator, "A." hypogaea, and "A." prisca – now in Aquilavus
- "Aquila" ferox, "A." lydekkeri – protostrigid owls, now in Minerva.

"Aquila" danana (Snake Creek Late Miocene/Early Pliocene of Loup Fork, USA), occasionally placed in Geranoaetus or Buteo, was a bird of prey of unclear relationships.
