= Clanga =

Clanga may refer to:

- Clanga (bird), the spotted eagle genus in the family Accipitridae
- 8979 Clanga, a main-belt asteroid
