= Lindi Nature Reserve =

Protected area in Estonia

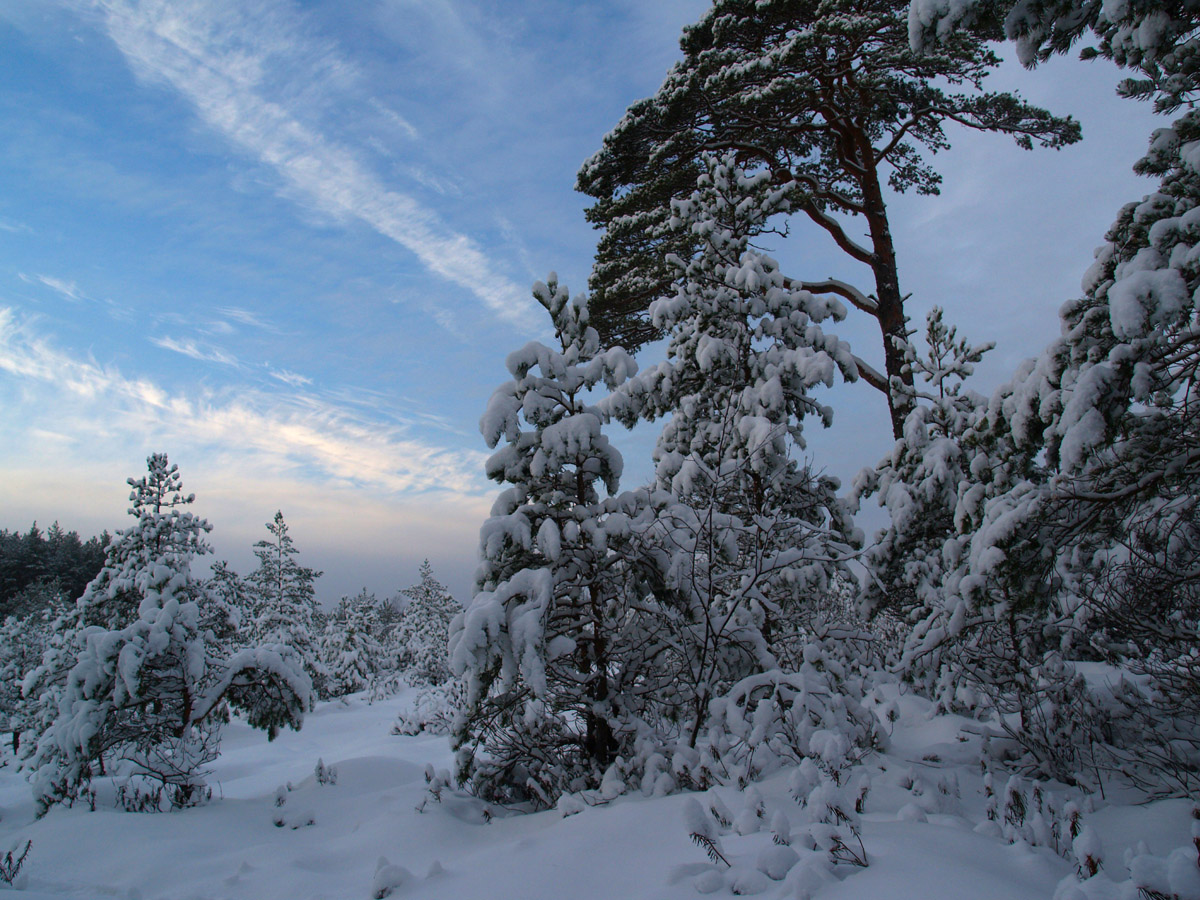

- Location within Estonia
- Location: Estonia
- Nearest city: Pärnu
- Coordinates: 58°18′33″N 24°13′20″E
- Area: 1,095 ha (2,710 acres)

Lindi Nature Reserve is a nature reserve situated in south-western Estonia, in Pärnu County.

Lindi Nature Reserve was established in 1958, and the protection of the site was expanded in 1999. The nature reserve is centred on Lindi bog, and consists mostly of herb-rich, wooded areas. It is an important habitat for many species, notably large birds of prey like the lesser spotted eagle and the white-tailed eagle.

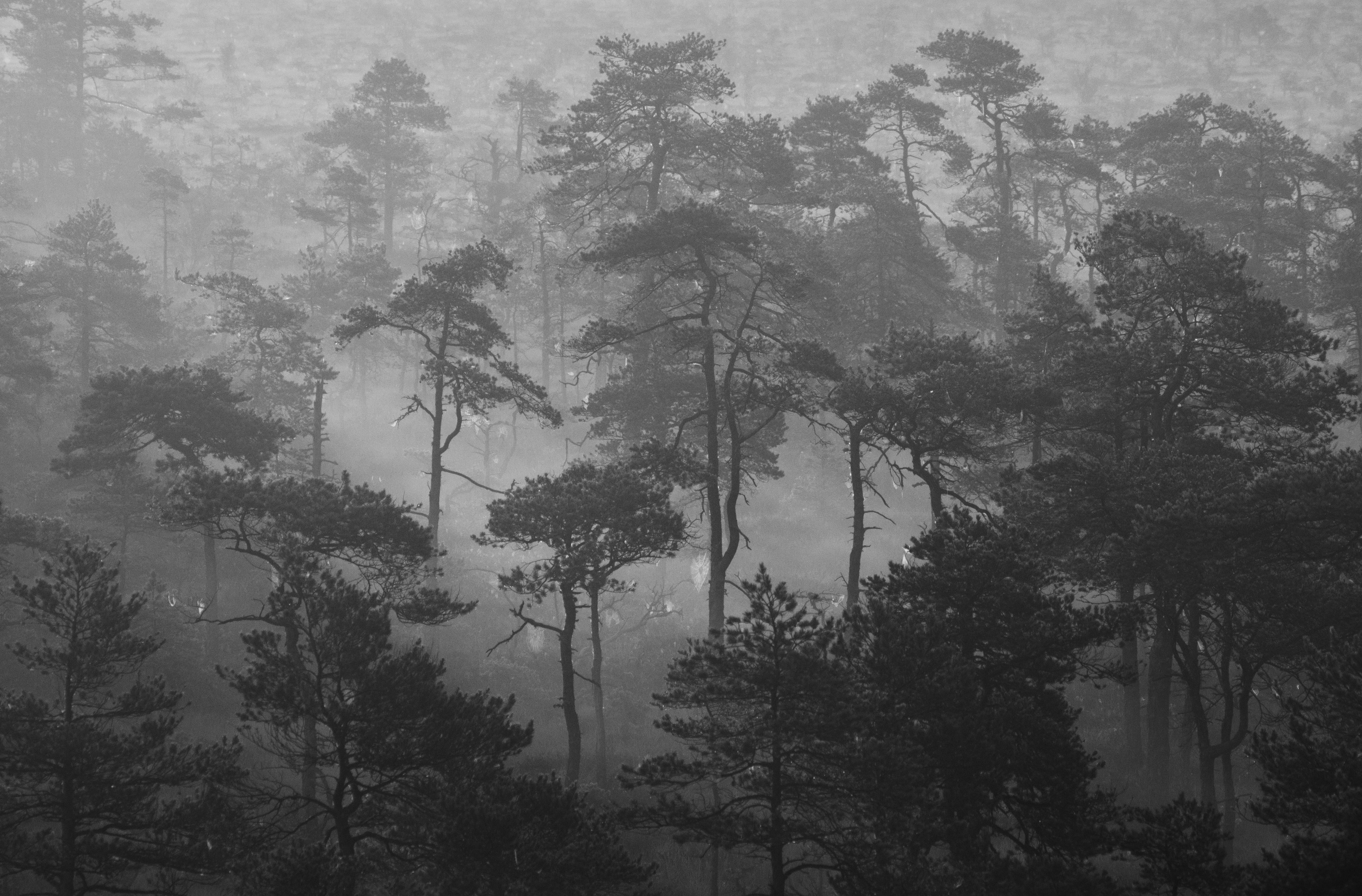

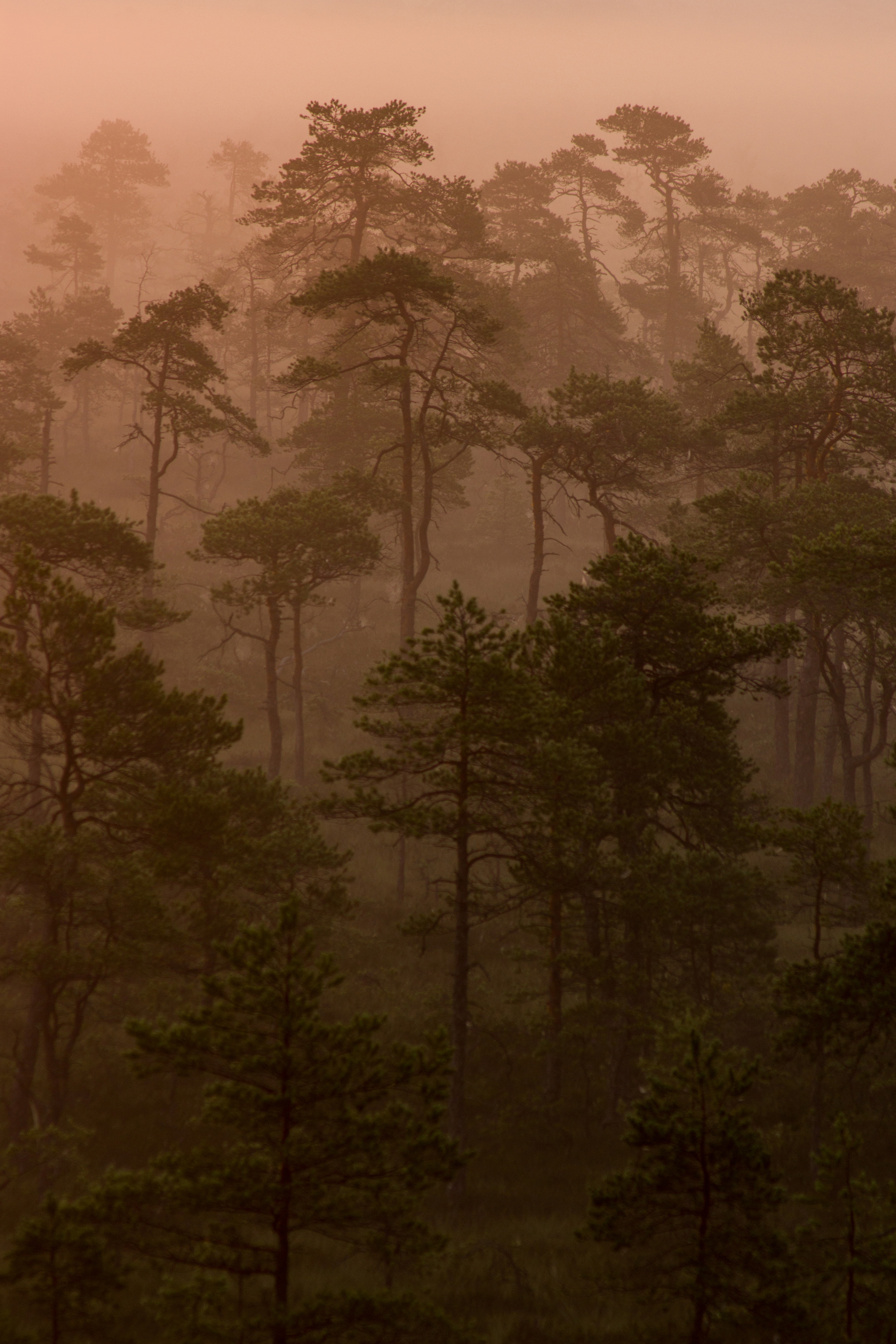

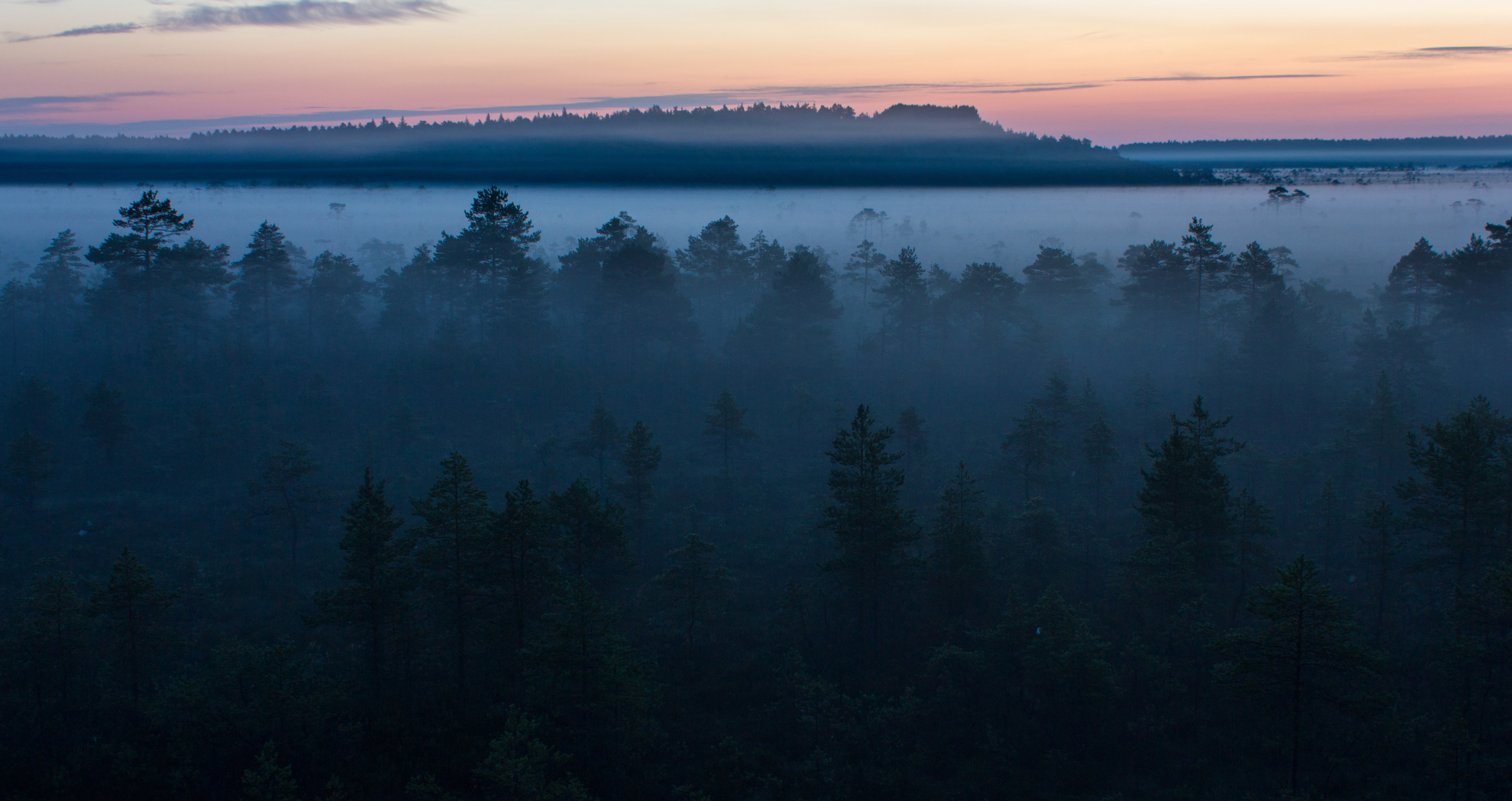

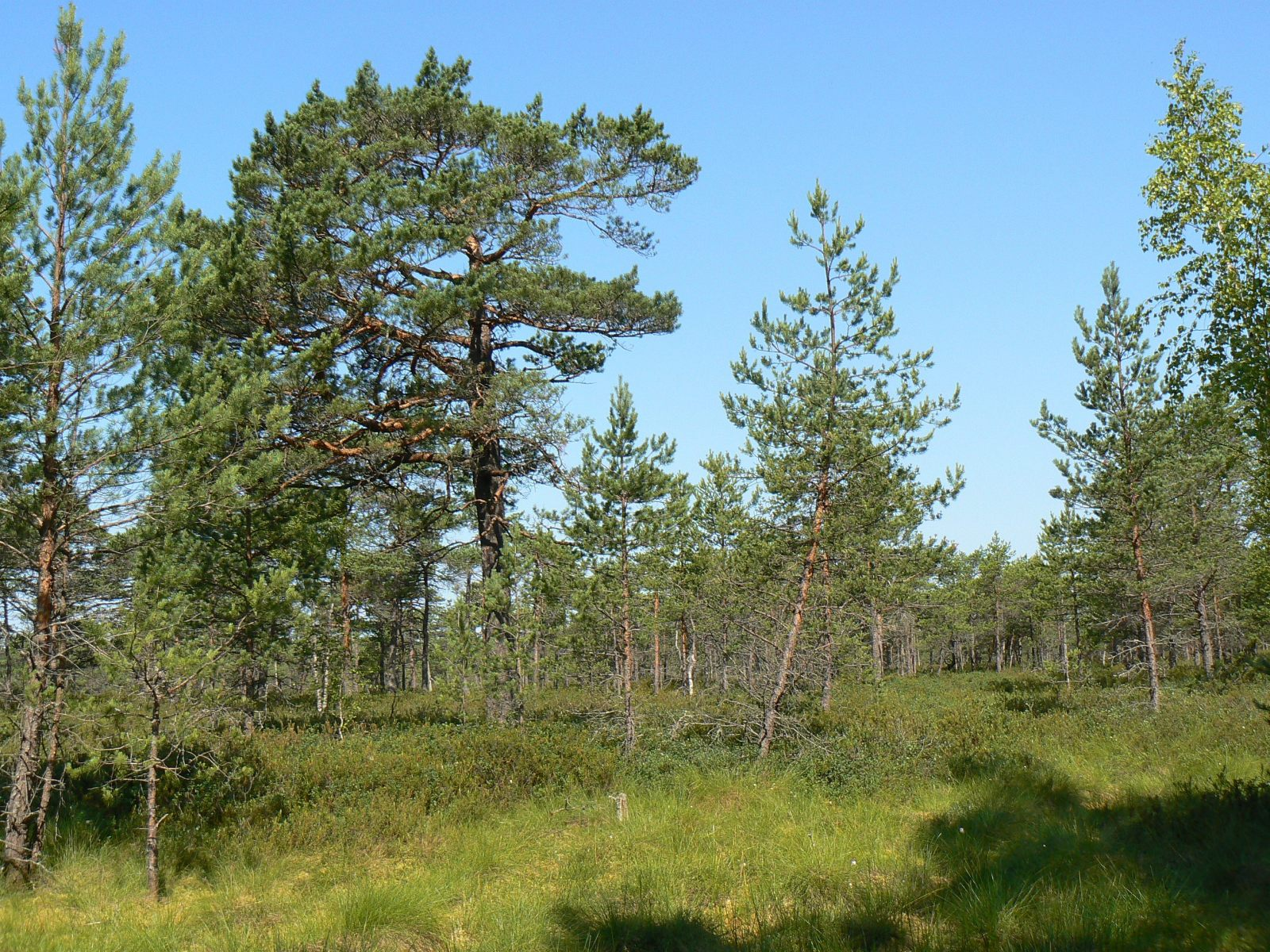
