= Aquila bullockensis =

Aquila bullockensis Temporal range: Middle Miocene 11–5 Ma

Scientific classification
- Kingdom: Animalia
- Phylum: Chordata
- Class: Aves
- Order: Accipitriformes
- Family: Accipitridae
- Genus: Aquila
- Species: A. bullockensis

Binomial name
- Aquila bullockensis Gaff & Boles, 2010

Extinct species of bird

Aquila bullockensis is an extinct species of large true eagles in the family Accipitridae. A. bullockensis is related to the living species A. audax to which it might be ancestral. The species is solely known from the distal end of a right humerus found in the Middle Miocene (about 12 Ma), Bullock Creek deposits in Australia. A. bullockensis is the oldest confirmed record of the genus Aquila in Australia, and possibly in the world.

== History and classification ==
The species is known solely from the holotype specimen, number QVM:2000:GFV:154, the distal end of a right humerus, conserved in the collections housed by the Queen Victoria Museum and Art Gallery in Launceston, Tasmania. The specimen was collected from Bullock Creek exposures of the Camfield Fossil Beds, located 550 kilometres (550,000 m) south-southeast of Darwin, Northern Territory, Australia. The bone was first studied by a pair of researchers from Monash University in Melbourne, Victoria and led by Priscilla Gaff as part of her master's thesis. Gaff and Walter E. Boles published their 2010 type description in the Records of the Australian Museum. The specific epithet "bullockensis" was chosen by the authors in recognition of the type locality, with the Latin ensis meaning "belonging to".

== Description ==
Within the possible bird families that the holotype may belong, it is distinguished from the old-world buzzards (Aegypiinae) and eagle-vultures (Gypaetinae) by its shallow fossa m. brachialis, a more bulbous processus flexorius and a broader condylus dorsalis. These features also distinguish the bone from Ospreys. Within the family Accipitridae the bone is similar to the genera Hieraaetus and Aquila. The two genera are very similar in morphology, and separation of the two is very difficult; they may be merged in the future. However the bone is closer in appearance to the modern species Aquila audax, Aquila chrysaetos and Aquila fasciata though is distinct enough to be considered a separate species. On the fossil the tuberculum supracondylare ventrale is flat unlike that of the modern species.

The humerus is 27.7 millimetres (1.09 in) wide on the distal end, while the shaft is broken off and missing above the fossa m. brachialis but enough bone is present to show that the shaft is curved. A. bullockensis was smaller in size then A. audax, A. chrysaetos and larger than A. fasciata. Though many members of Aquila display sexual dimorphism, the size of humerus is not a distinct feature.

Aquila bullockensis is one of the oldest members of the genus. The two species A. delphinensis and A. pennatoides which are from deposits in Grive-Saint-Alban, France, were described by Claude Gaillard in 1938 and also date to the Middle to Late Miocene. Of the other known Accipitridae bones from the Bullock Creek deposits several may belong to A. bullockensis, but none have been studied in depth to date.
