= Laurent Adamowicz =

French private banker

- Born: Paris, France
- Education: ESCP Europe, Wharton School, Columbia University, Harvard University
- Occupations: Founder and former President, EChO - Eradicate Childhood Obesity Foundation, Inc.

Laurent Adamowicz is a French businessman, entrepreneur, lecturer, author, and public health advocate. He is the founder and was president of the public charity EChO – Eradicate Childhood Obesity Foundation and a member of the Harvard T.H. Chan School of Public Health Nutrition Round Table.

== Education ==
Laurent Adamowicz is a graduate of the École Supérieure de Commerce de Paris and holds an MBA from Wharton.

== Career ==
Adamowicz was a co-founder of Global Commerce Technology Company (GC Tech SA), a technology company that introduced the first micro-payments system on the Internet in 1995.

He organized the buyout of Fauchon in January 1998.

Since 2005, Adamowicz has been a senior lecturer, an author, and a judge of academic competitions, including the annual business plan competition at the Wharton School of the University of Pennsylvania, Harvard College's Top Chef Competition, the Harvard President’s Challenge, and the Harvard T. H. Chan School of Public Health and Harvard Law School Deans' Challenge. Previously, Adamowicz worked in the food industry and was an investment banker.

=== Bon'App ===
Adamowicz founded Bon'App in 2010, a social enterprise designed to combat the global epidemic of obesity through the use of an application that told users what was in their food. The app used simple language about calories, sugar, salt and 'bad fat' (the sum of saturated fats and trans fats). In 2012, Bon'App initiated a research program and clinical study in public schools in Baton Rouge, Louisiana, with Pennington Biomedical Research Center to improve the nutrition conditions of children in public schools in the region. In 2013, the Harvard Business School published a case study entitled: "Advanced Leadership Pathways: Laurent Adamowicz and Bon'App".

=== EChO - Eradicate Childhood Obesity Foundation ===
Adamowicz founded Eradicate Childhood Obesity Foundation (EChO) in 2015. EChO was a 501(c)(3) public charity based in Cambridge, Massachusetts. The foundation advocated universal nutrition education, from kindergarten to medical schools, and a new food labeling system that it intended to test in public schools in the Boston/Cambridge area. EChO focused on technology-based education interventions. It created the first augmented reality app for public health, called SugAR Poke.
