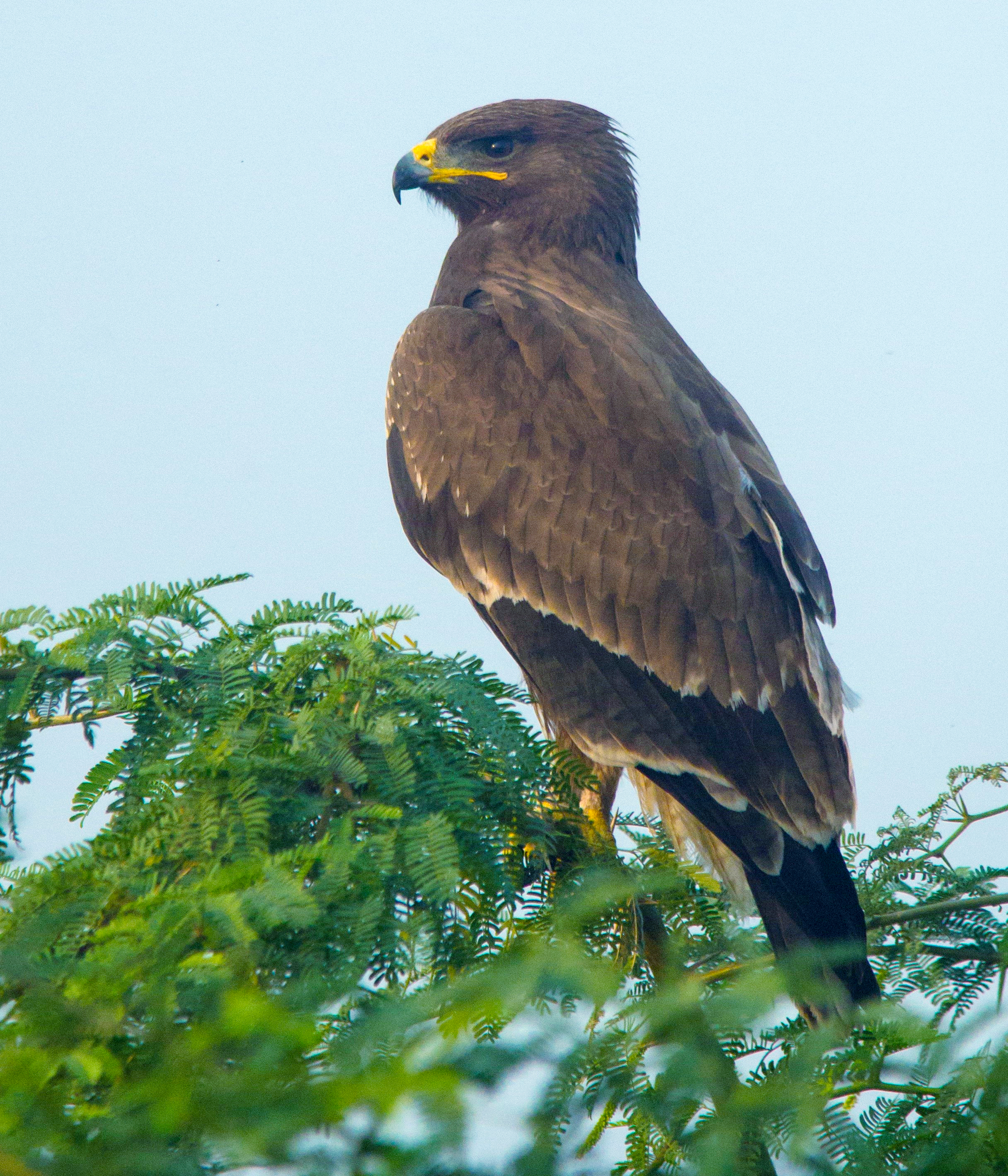
- Adult Indian spotted eagle, Nal Sarovar Bird Sanctuary, Gujarat

Conservation status
- Near Threatened (IUCN 3.1)

Scientific classification
- Kingdom: Animalia
- Phylum: Chordata
- Class: Aves
- Order: Accipitriformes
- Family: Accipitridae
- Genus: Clanga
- Species: C. hastata

Binomial name
- Clanga hastata (Lesson, RP, 1831)
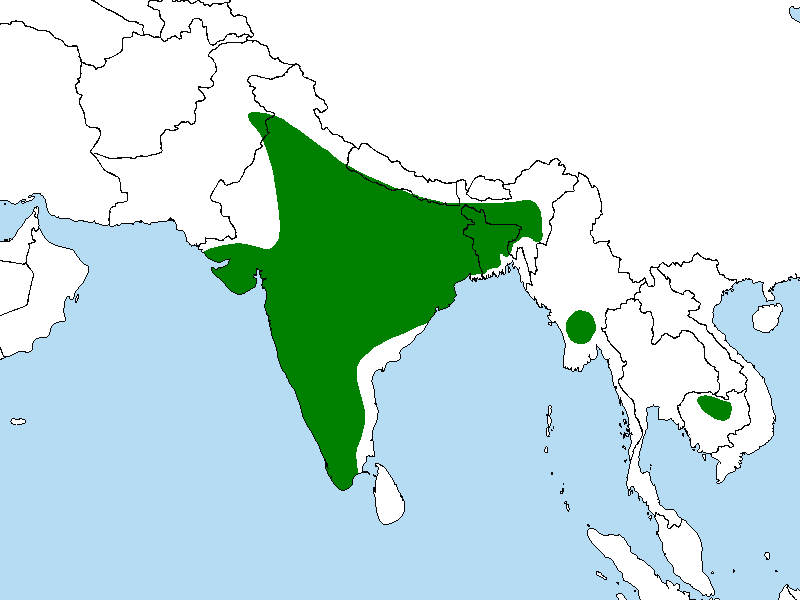
- Range of C. hastata in dark green

Synonyms
- Aquila hastata

= Indian spotted eagle =

Species of bird

The Indian spotted eagle (Clanga hastata) is a large bird of prey native to the Indian subcontinent. Like all typical eagles, it belongs to the family Accipitridae. The typical eagles are often united with the buteos, sea eagles and other more heavy-set Accipitridae, but more recently it appears as if they are less distinct from the more slender accipitrine hawks.

== Description ==
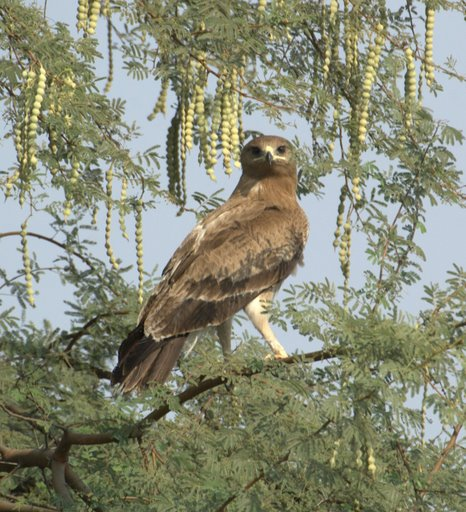
Indian spotted eagle

The Indian spotted eagle is about 60 cm (24 in) in length and has a wingspan of 150 cm (59 in). It is broad-headed, with the widest mouth of all spotted eagles. This species is a lighter overall compared to its relatives, with a darker iris that makes the eyes appear darker than the plumage (rather than the other way around as in the two northern spotted eagle species). Adults can be told apart from the greater spotted eagle by its lighter colour, darker eyes, and habitat preference. After about three or four months the young birds are glossy brown with the tips of the head and neck feathers being creamy and giving a spotted appearance. The upper tail coverts are light brown with white giving a barred appearance. The median coverts have large creamy spots. After about eighteen months the bird moults and becomes a darker shade and has less spots.

== Distribution and habitat ==
The Indian spotted eagle is native to Bangladesh, Cambodia, India, Myanmar, Nepal, and (marginally) in Pakistan. It occurs in agricultural landscapes and tropical dry forests.

== Systematics, taxonomy and evolution ==
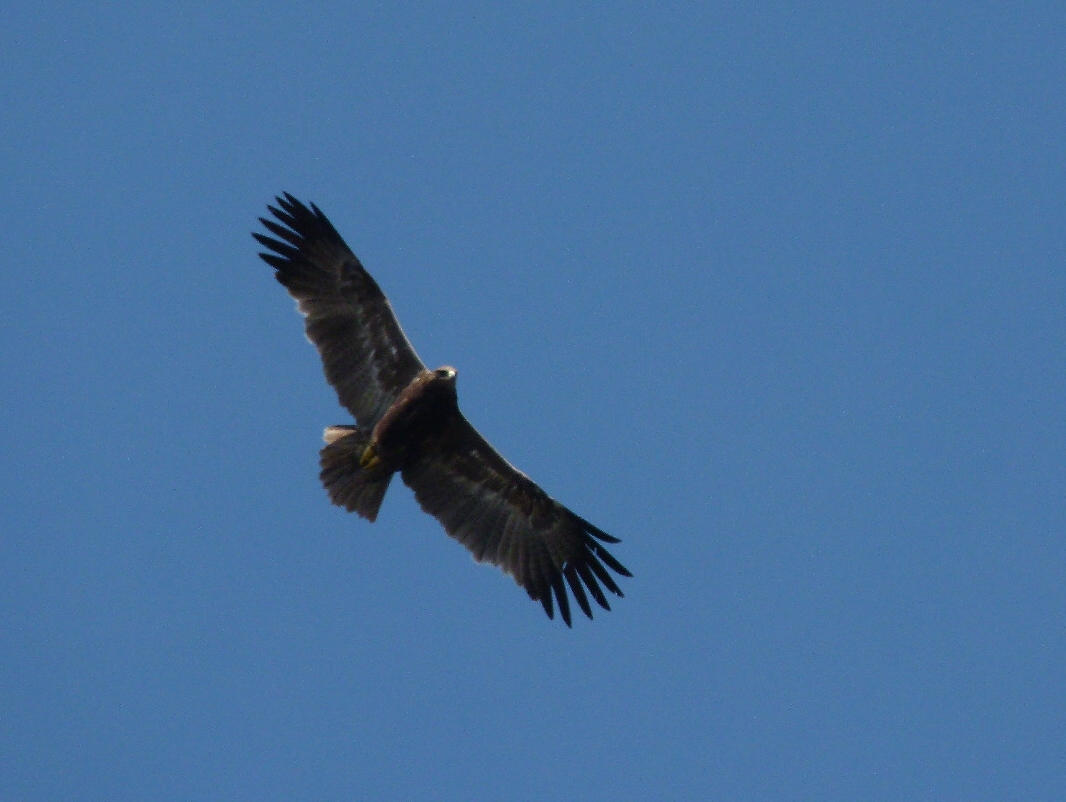
Underwing pattern

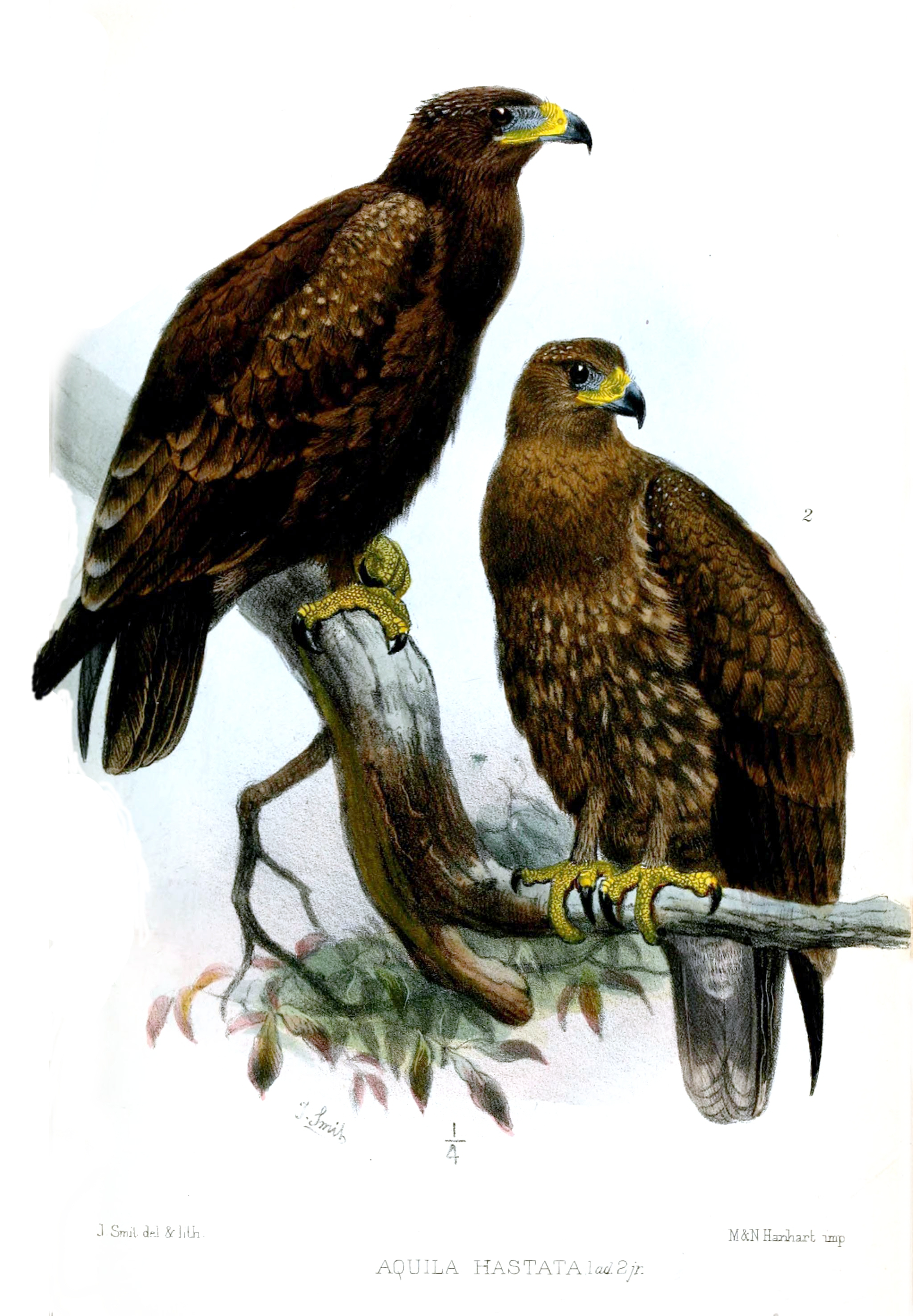
Illustration of an adult and a juvenile by Joseph Smit (1875)

The Indian spotted eagle was earlier considered as the resident of eastern subspecies of the lesser spotted eagle but has proven quite distinct and readily separable by morphological, behavioral, ecological and DNA sequence data. The Indian lineage seems to have diverged around the middle Pliocene, perhaps some 3.6 million years ago, from the common ancestor of the lesser and greater spotted eagles. The "proto-spotted eagle" probably lived in the general region of Afghanistan, being split into a northern and a southern lineage when both glaciers and deserts advanced in Central Asia as the last ice age began.

The spotted eagles as a group although quite distinct from the typical members, were formerly included in the genus Aquila, the "true eagles". They are now placed in their separate genus Clanga.
