= Bon'App =

Bon'App, Inc.
- Type: Private
- Industry: Software, Information Retrieval Services, Consumer Goods Analytics
- Founded: May 15, 2010
- Founder: Laurent Adamowicz
- Headquarters: Cambridge, MA

Bon'App, Inc. is a social enterprise in Cambridge, Massachusetts that was founded by Laurent Adamowicz. Bon'App is an open platform that includes applications for Apple mobile devices and Android phones.The Bon'App application is type-and-voice-powered, instantly telling users what is in their food in terms of caloric breakdown, sugar, salt, and "bad fat" (the sum of saturated fat and trans fat). With the official lifting of the U.S. Securities and Exchange Commission's ban on general solicitation on Sept. 23, 2013, Bon'App has officially begun raising capital by offering securities to accredited investors on the crowd-funding platform Fundable.

== History ==
The concept of Bon'App emerged in 2009 when Laurent Adamowicz, a serial entrepreneur and former food industry executive, dreamed of a "food-sniffing phone" while writing a thesis on the socio-cultural anthropology of food at Columbia University in New York City. Bon'App, Inc. is a C corporation that was incorporated in Delaware on May 15, 2010. The app's first release came out as a pilot at the end of October 2011.

The 5th release of the beta version on iTunes came out in March 2012. Version 2.0 of the Android and iOS app was released on May 4 and June 11, 2012, respectively. This version is redesigned with a simpler and more powerful search function.

== Research ==
Bon’App has been working with researchers at Pennington Biomedical Research Center in Baton Rouge, LA to help fight teen obesity. Bon'App was able to monitor food behavior to make healthy eating recommendations.
