= Wacław Adamowicz =

Polish footballer

Personal information
- Date of birth: August 2, 1905
- Place of birth: near Kaluga, Russian Empire
- Date of death: 2 October 1939 (aged 34)
- Place of death: Kock, Poland
- Height: 1.78 m (5 ft 10 in)
- Position: Goalkeeper

Senior career*
| Years | Team | Apps | (Gls) |
| –1924 | Polonia Warsaw | | |
| 1924–1926 | Orkan Warsaw | | |
| 1927–1935 | Legia Warsaw | 58 | (0) |
- * Club domestic league appearances and goals

Wacław Adamowicz (2 August 1905 – 2 October 1939) was a Polish footballer who played as a goalkeeper.

== Personal life ==
Adamowicz served as a captain in the Polish Army during the Second World War. On 2 October 1939, he was killed in action on the first day of the Battle of Kock, the final battle in the invasion of Poland in World War II.
