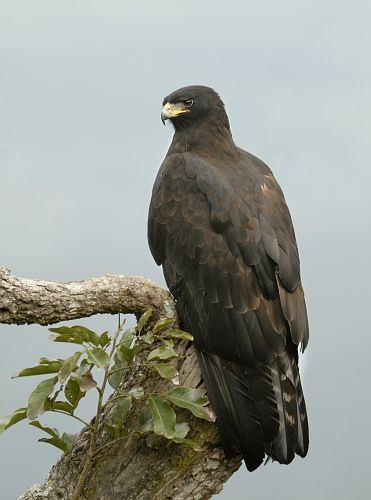
- The wing tip reaches the tail at rest (ssp. perniger)

Conservation status
- Least Concern (IUCN 3.1)

Scientific classification
- Kingdom: Animalia
- Phylum: Chordata
- Class: Aves
- Order: Accipitriformes
- Family: Accipitridae
- Genus: Ictinaetus; Blyth, 1843
- Species: I. malaiensis

Binomial name
- Ictinaetus malaiensis (Temminck, 1822)

Subspecies
- I. m. perniger - (Hodgson, 1836); I. m. malaiensis - (Temminck, 1822)

Synonyms
- Neopus malayensis; Ictinaetus malayensis; Aquila pernigra

= Black eagle =

Species of bird

The black eagle (Ictinaetus malaiensis) is a bird of prey. Like all eagles, it is in the family Accipitridae, and it is the only member of the genus Ictinaetus. It soars over forests in the hilly regions of tropical and subtropical South and Southeast Asia, as well as southeastern China, hunting mammals and birds, particularly at their nests. It is easily identified by its widely splayed and long primary "fingers", the characteristic silhouette, slow flight and yellow ceres and legs that contrast with the dark feathers.

== Taxonomy and systematics ==
The species name is spelt malayensis in many publications, but the original spelling used by Temminck in his description was malaiensis, according to a 2011 finding of some of the original covers of the part publications, leading to taxonomists applying the principle of priority and rejecting any later spelling emendations.

A molecular phylogenetic study of the Accipitridae published in 2024 found that the black eagle is sister to the three spotted eagles in the genus Clanga.

Two subspecies are recognised:

- I. m. perniger (Hodgson, 1836) – north India and Nepal, Bhutan, south India and Sri Lanka.
- I. m. malaiensis (Temminck, 1822) – Myanmar, Bangladesh, south China, southeast Asia and the Indonesian Archipelago (except the Lesser Sunda Islands).

== Description ==
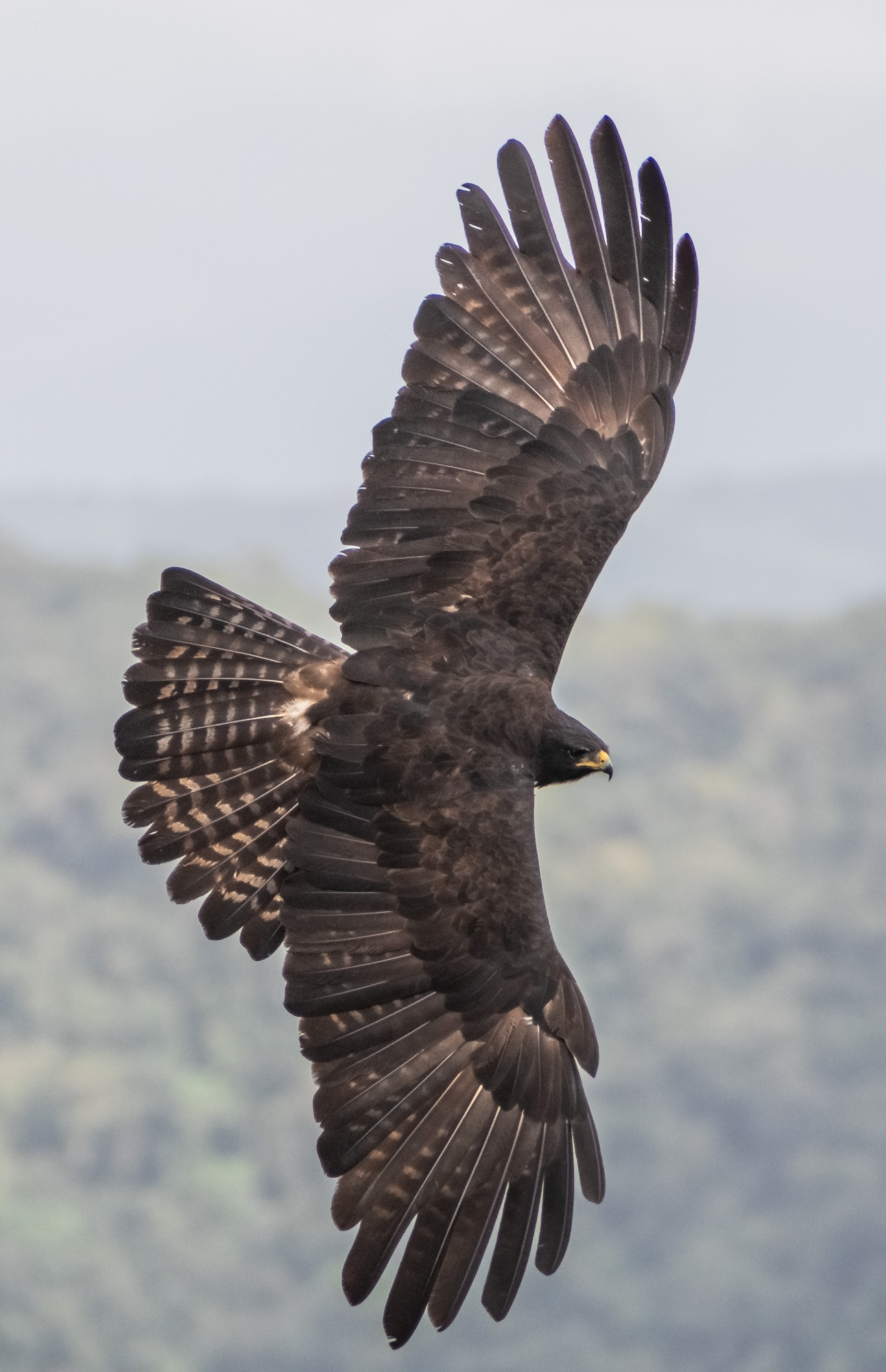
Black eagle wing span

The black eagle is a large but slender eagle, at about 75 cm (30 in) in length and 148 to 182 cm (4 ft 10 in to 6 ft 0 in) in wingspan. Despite its large appearance (it is one of the largest eagles in its range), known weights are modest, at between 1,000 and 1,600 g (2.2 and 3.5 lb)—about half the weight of the partially sympatric mountain hawk-eagle, the latter being of a similar total length. Adults have all-black plumage, with a yellow bill base (cere) and feet. The wings are long and pinched in at the innermost flight feathers, giving a distinctive shape. The tail shows faint barring and upper tail covers are paler. On a perched bird, the wing tips reach or exceed the tail tip. The wings are held in a shallow V (wings just above the horizontal plane) in flight. Seen on hot afternoons, scouring the treetops for a nest to maraud, this bird is easily spotted by its black colour, large size, and a characteristic slow flight, sometimes just above the canopy.

Sexes are similar; young birds have a buff head, underparts and underwing coverts. The wing shape helps to distinguish this species from the dark form of changeable hawk-eagle (Nisaetus cirrhatus). The tarsi are fully feathered and the toes are relatively stout and short, with long claws (particularly on the inner toe) that are less strongly curved than in other birds of prey.

== Distribution and habitat ==
The black eagle breeds in tropical and subtropical Asia. Race perniger (Hodgson, 1836) is found in the Himalayan foothills west through Nepal into the Indian states of Himachal Pradesh and Jammu and Kashmir, and in the forests of the Eastern and Western Ghats in peninsular India and Sri Lanka. The bird's westernmost extent is to Gujarat, especially in the forested areas in southern and eastern Gujarat. The species also extends into the Aravalli range of northwestern India. The nominate race malaiensis (Temminck, 1822) is found in Myanmar, Bangladesh, southern China (Yunnan, Fujian) and Taiwan, into Southeast Asia.

It is generally resident, and no migration has been observed. In a study in southern India, it was found to favour forests with good forest cover and was absent from areas where the cover was less than 50%. Black eagles have been regularly observed in the skies of Bangladesh, where they are known to breed and thrive, particularly in the hilly and forested regions of the country. Their presence is most prominent in the southeastern and northeastern areas, where the terrain is characterized by dense forests and rolling hills. Among these regions, Chittagong and Sylhet stands out as a key habitat for the black eagle.

== Behaviour and ecology ==
=== Breeding ===
The courtship display involves steep dives with folded wings with swoops up in a U shape into a vertical stall. They build a platform nest, 3 to 4 feet wide, on a tall tree overlooking a steep valley. One or two white eggs blotched in brown and mauve may be laid during the nesting season between January and April. The nest site may be reused year after year.

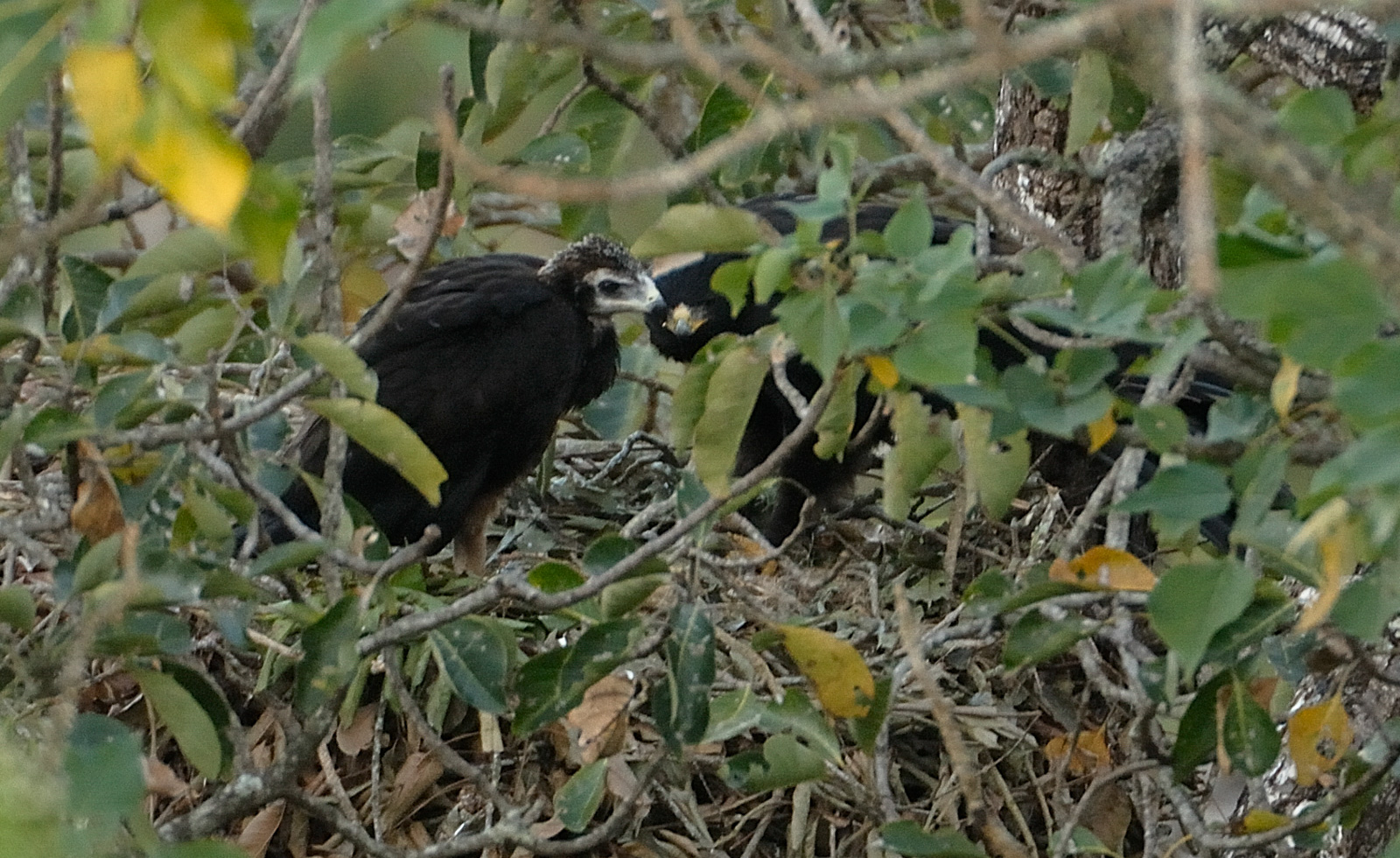
Black eagle nest

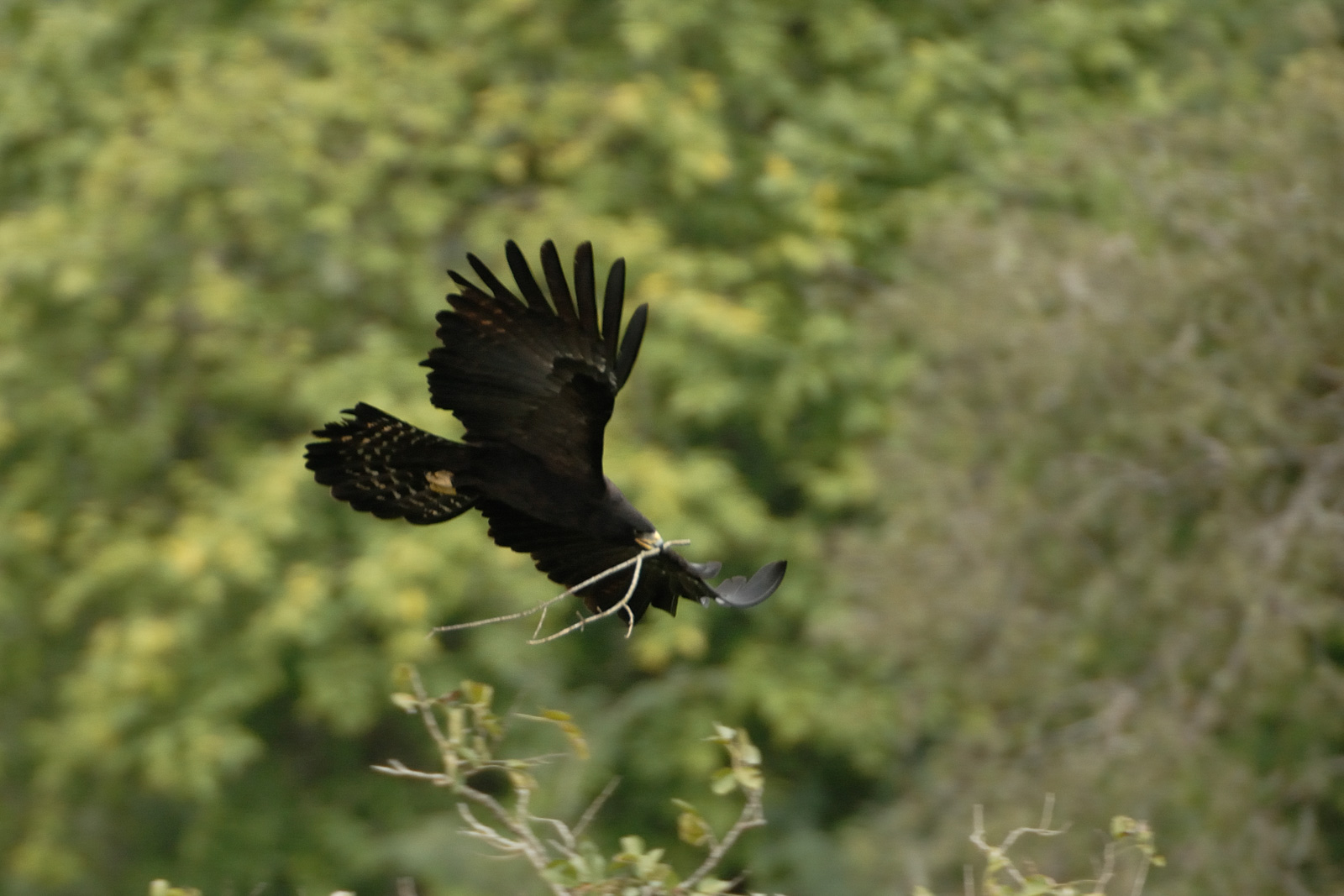
Black eagle bringing materials for nesting.

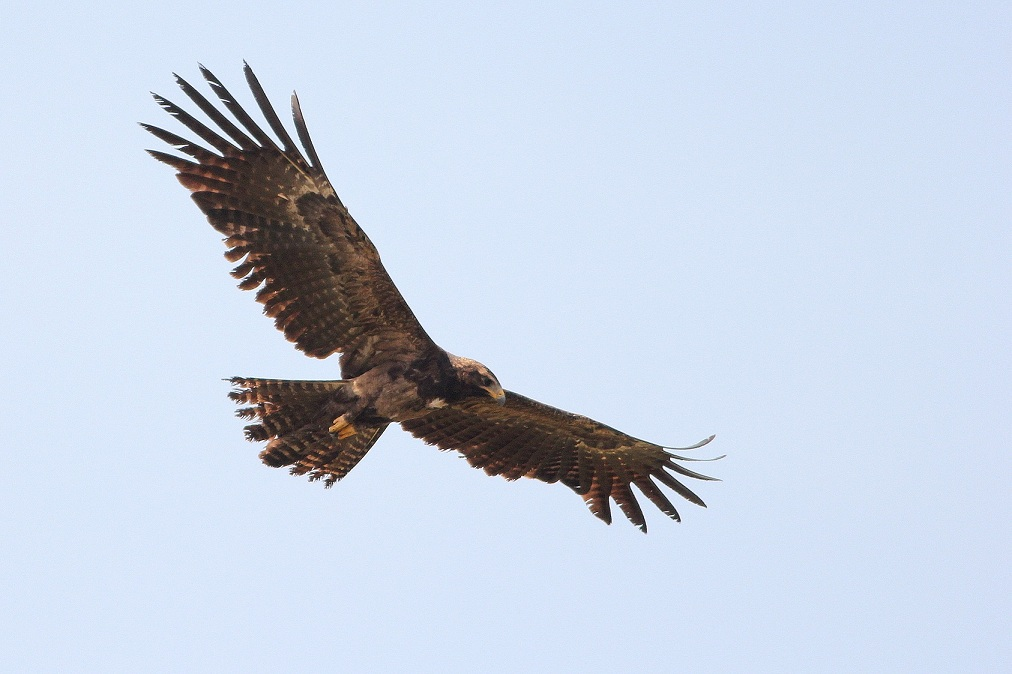
The primaries are long and well splayed in slow flight

=== Food and feeding ===
The black eagle eats mammals (including bats, squirrels and other small mammals), birds and eggs. It is a prolific nest-predator and is known for its slow flight just over the canopy. The curved claws and wide gape allow it to pick up eggs of birds from nests, as well as swiftlets from caves. Along with swallow-tailed kites it shares the unique habit of carrying away an entire nest with nestlings to a feeding perch. Squirrels, macaques and many species of birds emit alarm calls when these birds are spotted soaring over the forest. The Indian giant squirrel has been noted as a prey of this species, and young bonnet macaques may also fall prey to them.

=== Threats and survival ===
It is not threatened but is uncommon in large areas in its distribution. Shrinking of forested areas due to large-scale extraction has reduced its earlier range.

== Relationship to humans ==
Due to this eagle's ability to remain aloft for long periods with minimal effort, the Lepcha people of India's Darjeeling district described it as 'the bird that never sat down', while the Soliga people's name (kaana kattale) recalls its black colour and its presence in forested areas.
