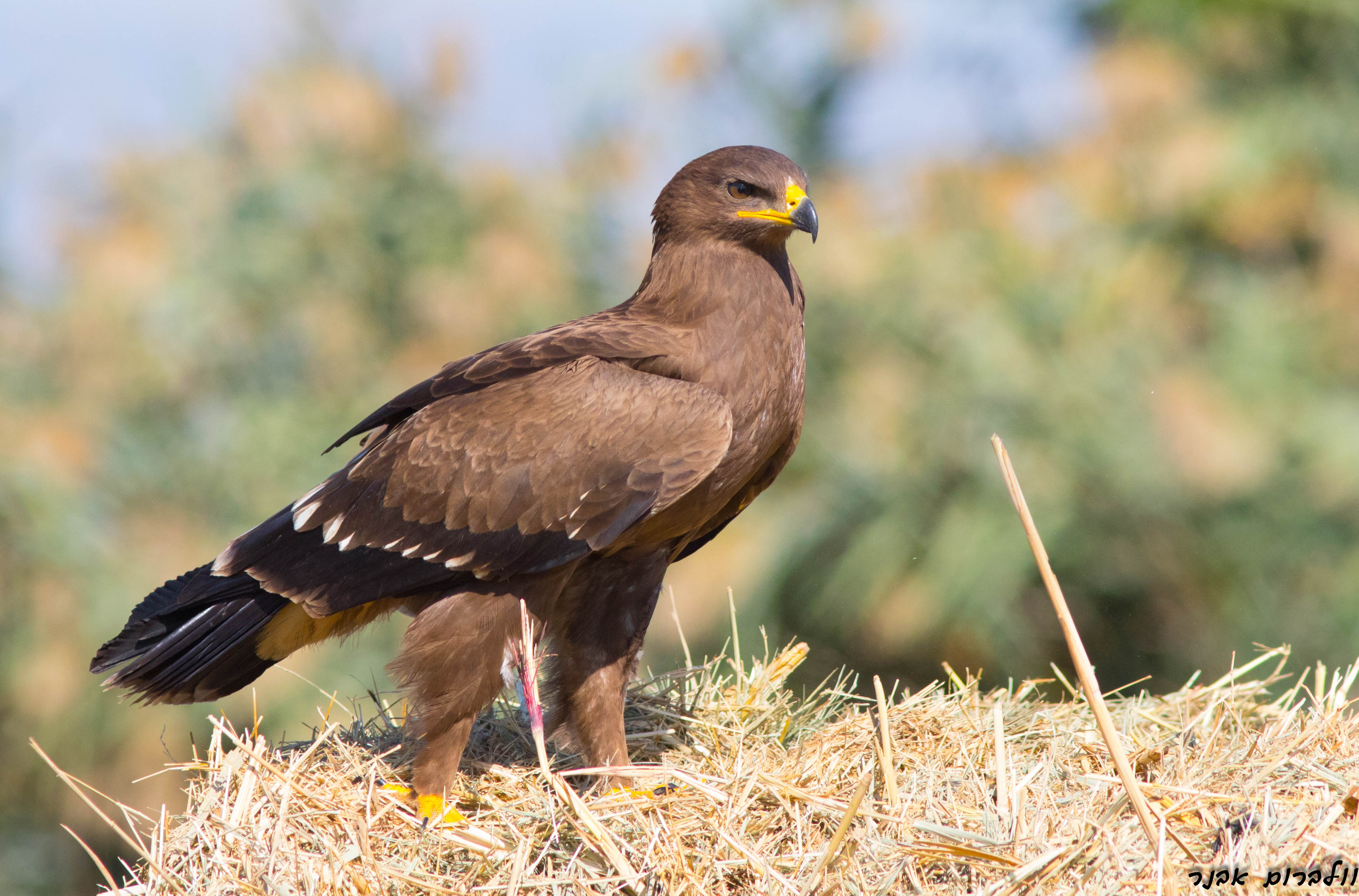
- Juvenile; Note white spots on wings and white V on rump

Conservation status
- Least Concern (IUCN 3.1)

Scientific classification
- Kingdom: Animalia
- Phylum: Chordata
- Class: Aves
- Order: Accipitriformes
- Family: Accipitridae
- Genus: Clanga
- Species: C. pomarina

Binomial name
- Clanga pomarina (Brehm, CL, 1831)
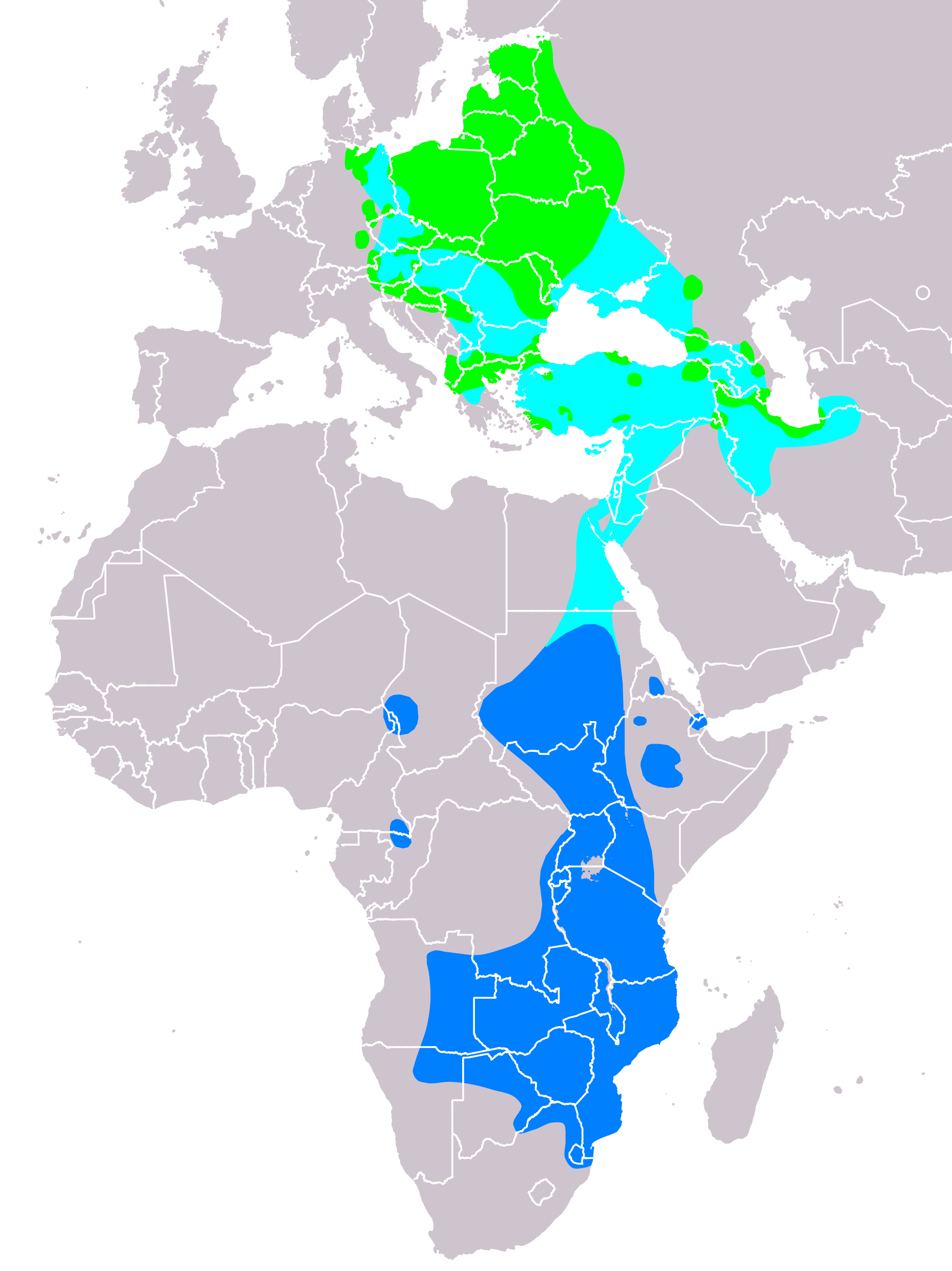
- Range of C. pomarina Breeding Non-breeding Passage

Synonyms
- Aquila pomarina

= Lesser spotted eagle =

Species of bird

The lesser spotted eagle (Clanga pomarina) is a large Eastern European bird of prey. Like all typical eagles, it belongs to the family Accipitridae. The typical eagles are often united with the buteos, sea eagles, and other more heavy-set Accipitridae, but more recently it appears as if they are less distinct from the more slender accipitrine hawks than believed.

== Description ==
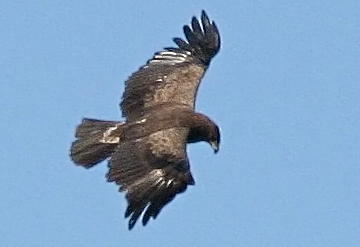
Adult in flight; white wing spots are lost while mature; only white V on rump remains

This is a medium-sized eagle, about 60 cm (24 in) in length and with a wingspan of 150 cm (59 in). Its head and wing coverts are pale brown and contrast with the generally dark plumage. The head and bill are small for an eagle. Usually, a white patch occurs on the upper wings, and even adults retain a clearly marked white "V" on the rump; the wing markings are absent and the white "V" is not well-defined in the greater spotted eagle.

The juvenile has less contrast in the wings, but the remiges bear prominent white spots. It differs from greater spotted eagle juveniles by a lack of wing covert spotting and the presence of a cream-colored neck patch.

The call is a dog-like yip.

== Taxonomy and evolution ==
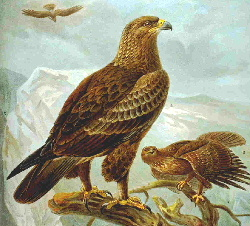
A drawing of a lesser spotted eagle

The birds formerly considered to be the resident Indian subspecies are now considered a separate species, the Indian spotted eagle (Clanga hastata), quite distinct and readily separable by morphological, behavioral, ecological, and DNA sequence data. The European taxon is actually closer to the greater spotted eagle; their common ancestor seems to have diverged around the middle Pliocene, perhaps some 3.6 million years ago, from the ancestors of the Indian birds. The "proto-spotted eagle" probably lived in the general region of Afghanistan, being split into a northern and a southern lineage when both glaciers and deserts advanced in Central Asia as the last ice age began. The northern lineage subsequently separated into the eastern (greater) and western (lesser) species of today, probably around the Pliocene-Pleistocene boundary not quite 2 million years ago.

The present species hybridizes occasionally with the greater spotted eagle. Hybrid birds are almost impossible to identify if not seen up close.

== Distribution and habitat ==
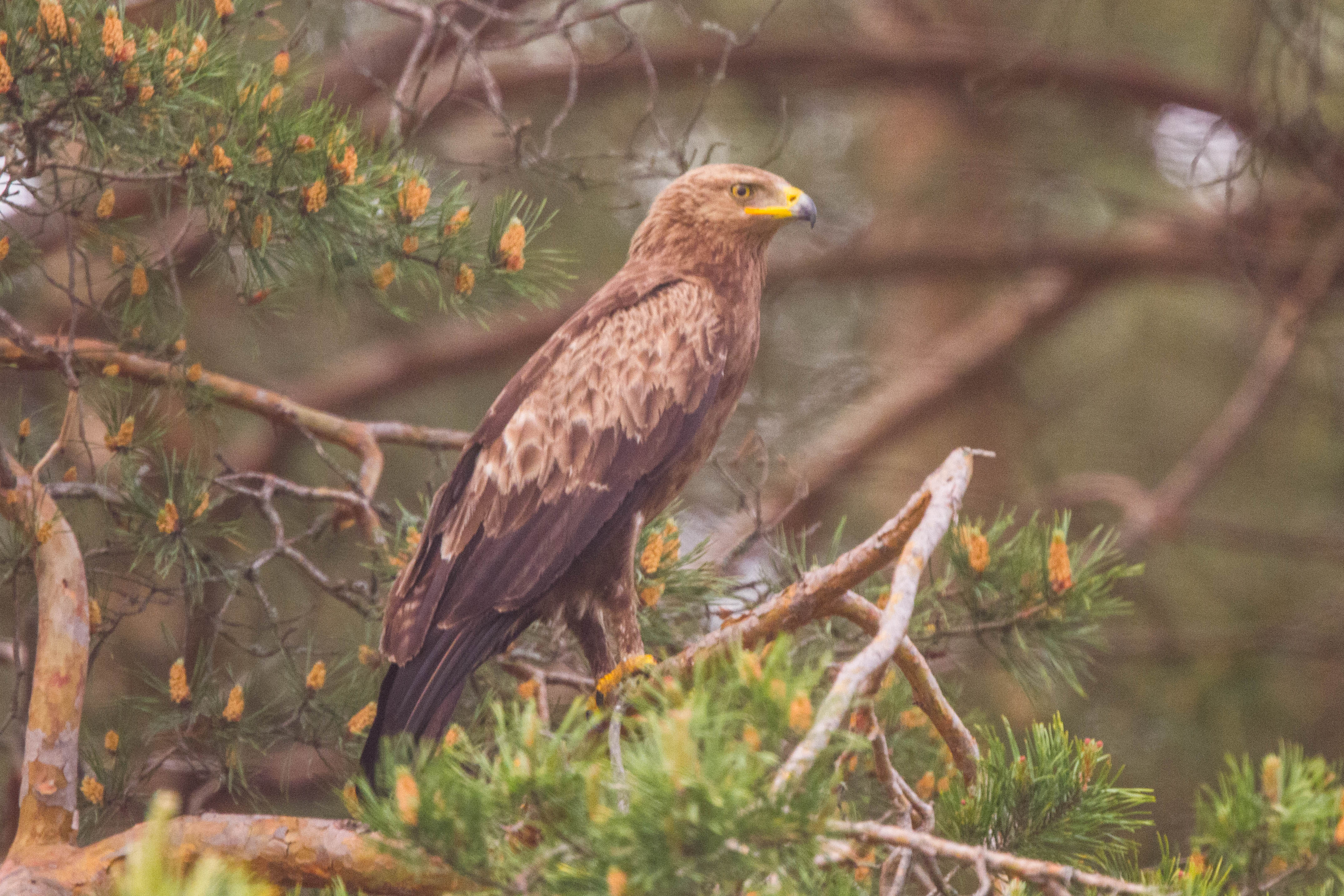
Adult in Belarus

The lesser spotted eagle breeds in Central and Eastern Europe and southeastward to Turkey and Armenia; and winters in Africa. This is a very wary species of open or lightly wooded country, in which it hunts small mammals (especially voles, ground squirrels, rats, and mice) and similar terrestrial prey, such as small birds, amphibians, reptiles, and occasionally insects (including termites). It is known to occasionally feed on carrion. Almost a fifth of the global lesser spotted eagle population nests in Latvia, with an estimated amount of 4000 pairs.

== Behaviour and ecology ==
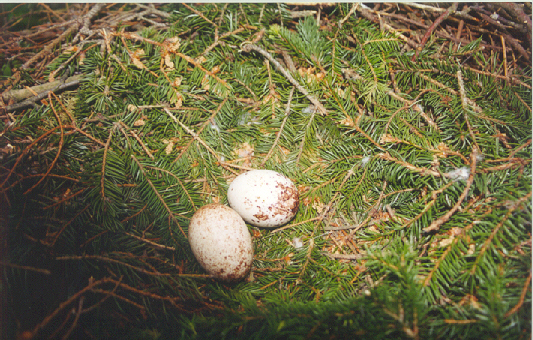
A two-egg clutch in nest

The lesser spotted eagle uses regularly spaced territories consistently between years in the north-western part of its distribution. The distances between territories vary across the region, although this was not found to be related to breeding success. Synchronous variation in breeding success across the region indicates that the eagles are instead influenced by large-scale factors such as fluctuations in climate or prey availability. The lesser spotted eagle lays one to three white, buff-spotted eggs in a tree nest. As usual for eagles, only in breeding seasons with very abundant prey does more than one young fledge, but the female starts incubating when the first egg has been laid, thus the first young to hatch usually outgrows its clutch mate(s) and will kill and even eat them sooner or later.
