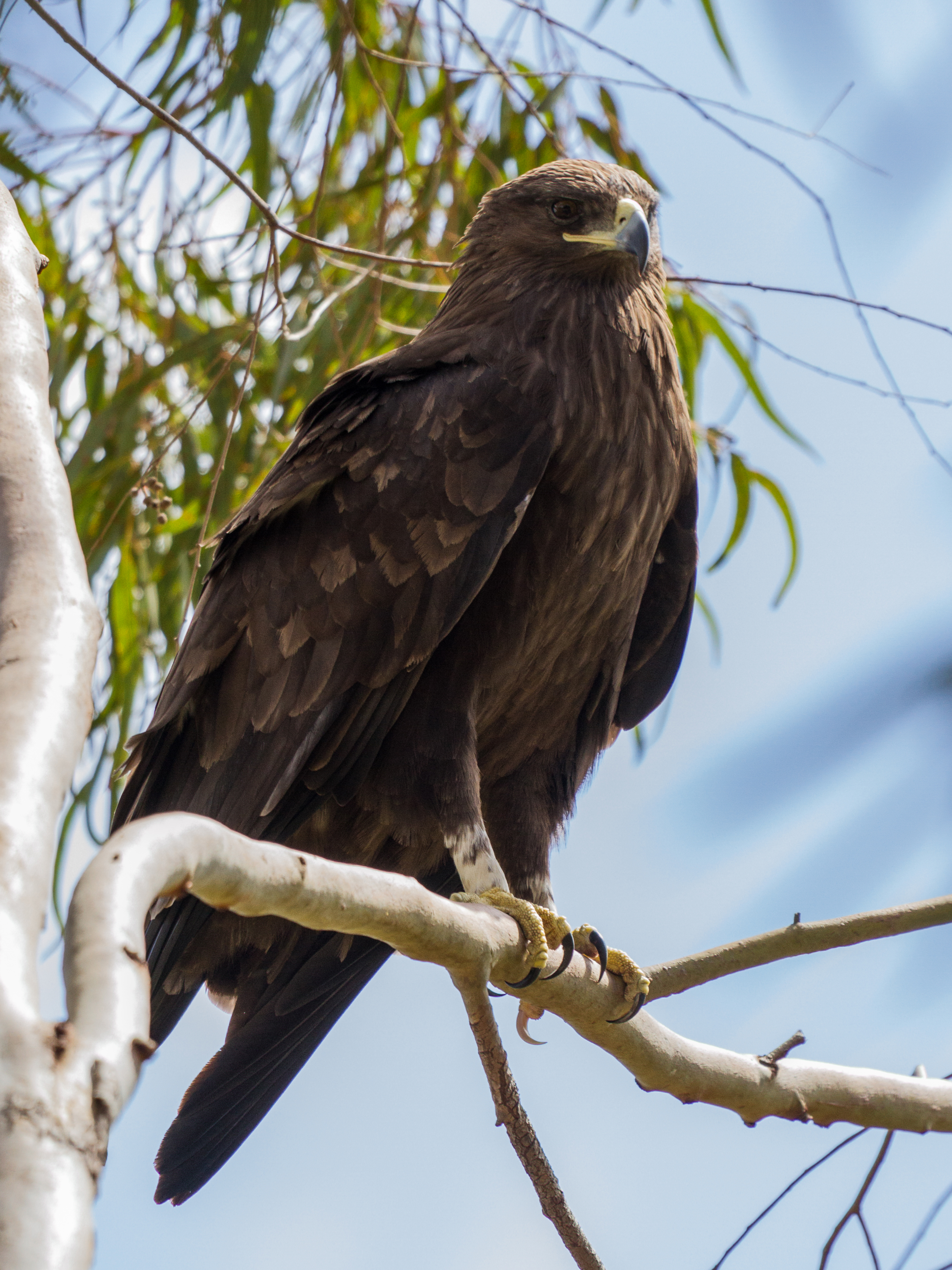
- Greater spotted eagle (Clanga clanga)

Scientific classification
- Kingdom: Animalia
- Phylum: Chordata
- Class: Aves
- Order: Accipitriformes
- Family: Accipitridae
- Subfamily: Aquilinae
- Genus: Clanga; Adamowicz, 1854

Type species
- Falco maculatus J. F. Gmelin, 1788 = Aquila clanga Pallas, 1811

= Clanga (bird) =

Genus of birds

Clanga is a genus which contains the spotted eagles. The genus name is from Ancient Greek klangos, "eagle".

== Taxonomy ==
The genus Clanga was described in 1854 by the Polish naturalist Adam Ferdynand Adamowicz (1802-1881). The type species is Falco maculatus J. F. Gmelin, 1788, a synonym of Aquila clanga (the greater spotted eagle) that was described in 1811 by Peter Simon Pallas. Falco maculatus J. F. Gmelin is preoccupied by Falco maculatus Tunstall 1771 but under the rules of the International Code of Zoological Nomenclature Falco maculatus is still considered to be the type species. The genus name is from Ancient Greek klangos meaning "eagle".

A molecular phylogenetic study of the Accipitridae published in 2024 found that the genus Clanga was sister to the genus Ictinaetus which contains the black eagle.

== Species ==
The genus contains three species:

Genus Clanga – Adamowicz, 1854 – three species
Common name	Scientific name and subspecies	Range	Size and ecology	IUCN status and estimated population
Indian spotted eagle	Clanga hastata (Lesson, 1834)	Bangladesh, India, Myanmar and Nepal.	Size: Habitat: Diet:	NT 2,500 - 9,999 ▼
Lesser spotted eagle	Clanga pomarina Brehm, 1831	Central and Eastern Europe and southeastward to Turkey and Armenia, and Africa	Size: Habitat: Diet:	LC 40,000 - 60,000
Greater spotted eagle	Clanga clanga ((Pallas, 1811)	northern Europe eastwards across Eurasia	Size: Habitat: Diet:	VU 3,900 - 10,000 ▼
