= Adam Ferdynand Adamowicz =

Lithuanian-Polish naturalist and a professor

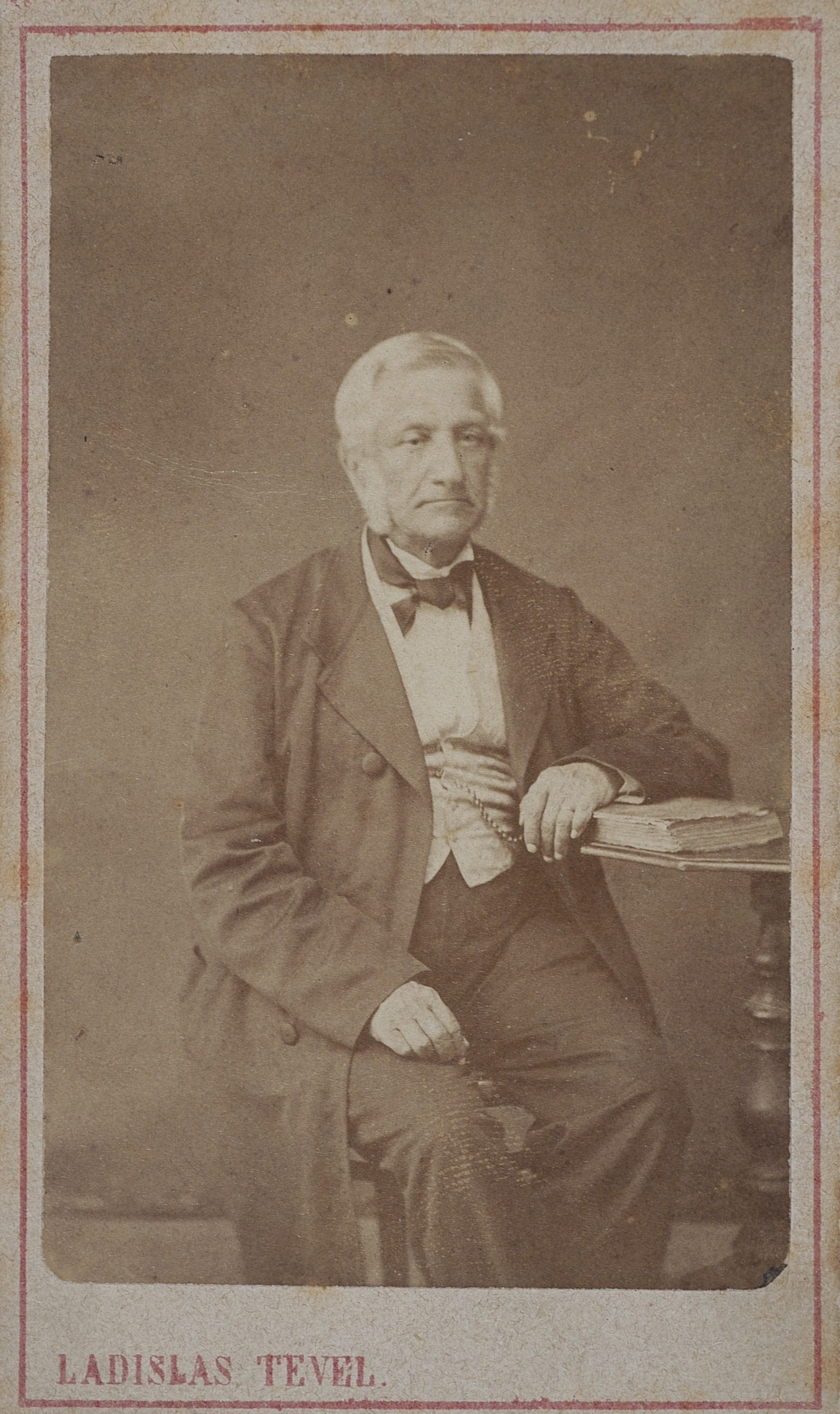
Carte-de-visite, 1875

Adam Ferdynand Adamowicz (6 December 1802 – 12 June 1881) was a Lithuanian-Polish naturalist and a professor of comparative anatomy at the University of Vilnius. He took a special interest in veterinary medicine.

== Life and work ==
Adamowicz was born in Vilnius in the Jewish household of Isaac Langfur from Königsberg and Sarah Adamowicz from Gdansk. He studied at home under tutors who included Tomasz Zan and Krystyna Lach Szyrma. He went to the Vilnius Gymnasium where he was influenced by Jan Śniadecki. He then went to the University of Vilnius in 1818. He studied chemistry under Jędrzej Śniadecki, botany under Stanisław Jundziłł, medicine from Ferdinand Spitznagel, and veterinary medicine under Ludwik Bojanus. He received a doctoral degree in 1824 with a dissertation on pathology titled Conspectus morborum. He married Evelina Zborowska, daughter of a Lithuanian court official. Along with his wife he then went on a scientific sojourn through St. Petersburg, Moscow, and Tartu working with professors there. In 1825 he was elected to the Vilnius Medical Society which had been founded by Jozef Frank and others in 1805. He returned to become an assistant professor in Vilnius in 1828. He travelled in Europe to study and work with other scholars. When he was in Berlin in 1831 he was elected to the Society for the Advancement of Natural Sciences and the Hessian Society of Natural Sciences. In Dresden he studied the collections of Carus. On his return the medical faculty was converted to the Imperial Medico-Chirurgical Academy. He initially worked in the place of Jędrzej Śniadecki who was ill. In 1834 he became an extraordinary professor of comparative anatomy at Vilnius. He was also a practicing physician, pathologist and veterinarian.

Adamowicz and his first wife had a son who was educated by Stanisław Krasiński and Father Łunkiewicz and the death of their son at the age of fifteen was a great blow. His wife became bedridden and died. Adamowicz travelled abroad seeking solace and gave up major research projects. He then married Zofia née Karnicka and travelled to Warsaw and Krakow. This was his last travel.
