= Sparrowhawk =

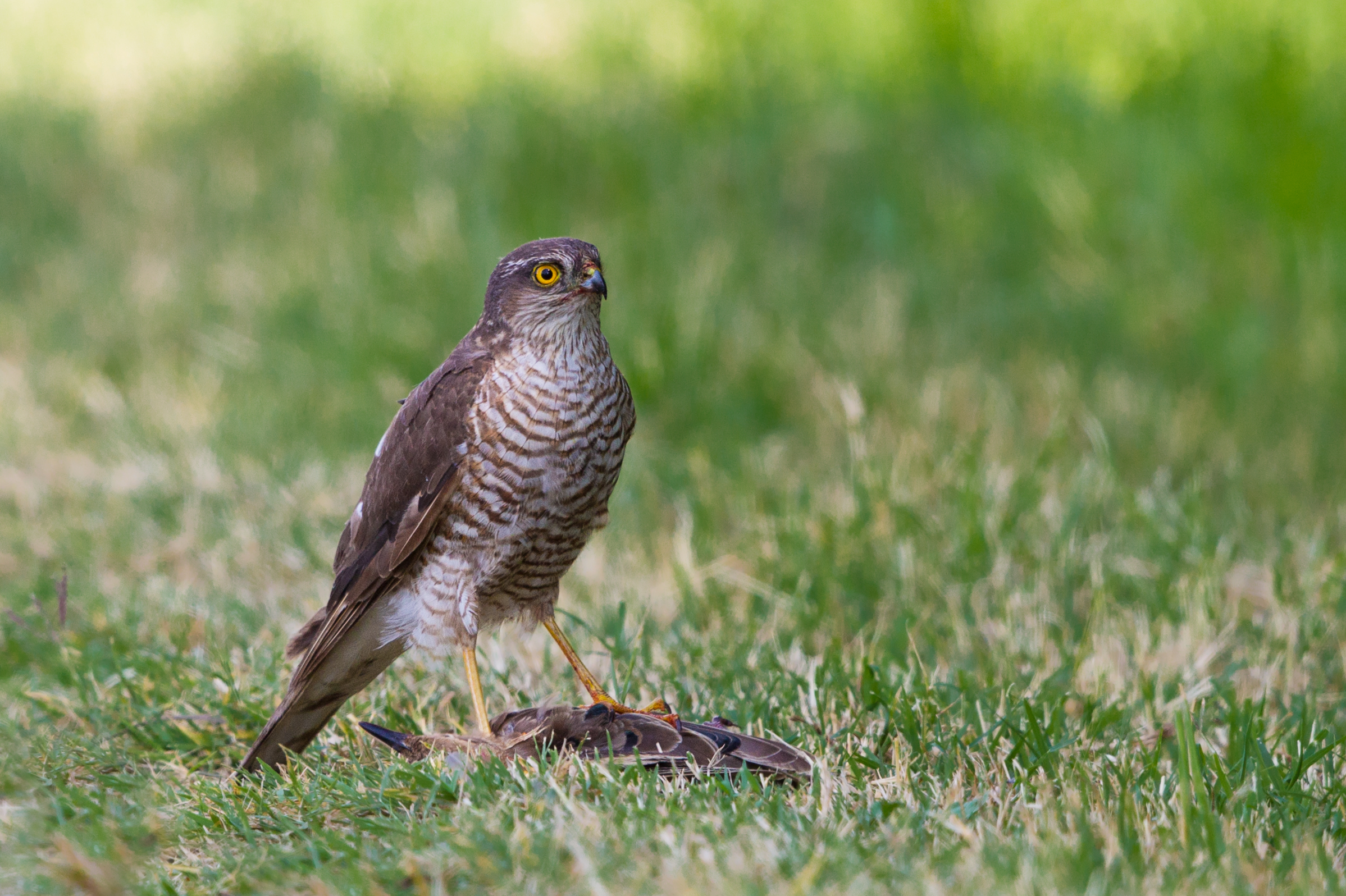
Accipiter nisus

Sparrowhawk (sometimes sparrow hawk) may refer to several species of small hawk in the subfamily Accipitrinae. "Sparrow-hawk" or sparhawk originally referred to Accipiter nisus, now called "Eurasian" or "northern" sparrowhawk to distinguish it from other species.

The American kestrel (Falco sparverius), a North American falcon species, is also commonly referred to as a "sparrow hawk", although it is not closely related.

Sparrowhawk species include:

Common name	Scientific	Range
Chestnut-flanked sparrowhawk	Aerospiza castanilius	Africa
Collared sparrowhawk	Tachyspiza cirrocephalus	Australia
Eurasian sparrowhawk	Accipiter nisus	Europe/Asia
Chinese sparrowhawk	Tachyspiza soloensis	Asia
Spot-tailed sparrowhawk	Tachyspiza trinotatus	Indonesia
Japanese sparrowhawk	Tachyspiza gularis	Japan
Levant sparrowhawk	Tachyspiza brevipes	Africa Europe Asia
Little sparrowhawk	Tachyspiza minullus	Africa
Madagascar sparrowhawk	Accipiter madagascariensis	Madagascar
New Britain sparrowhawk	Tachyspiza brachyurus	Papua New Guinea
Nicobar sparrowhawk	Tachyspiza butleri	Nicobar Islands
Ovambo sparrowhawk	Accipiter ovampensis	Sub-saharan Africa
Black sparrowhawk	Astur melanoleucus	Sub-saharan Africa
Red-thighed sparrowhawk	Tachyspiza erythropus	Africa
Rufous-chested sparrowhawk	Accipiter rufiventris	Sub-saharan Africa
Rufous-necked sparrowhawk	Tachyspiza erythrauchen	Maluku Islands
Slaty-mantled sparrowhawk	Tachyspiza luteoschistaceus	Papua New Guinea
Dwarf sparrowhawk	Tachyspiza nanus	Sulawesi
Vinous-breasted sparrowhawk	Tachyspiza rhodogaster	Sulawesi
Frances's sparrowhawk	Tachyspiza francesii	Madagascar
