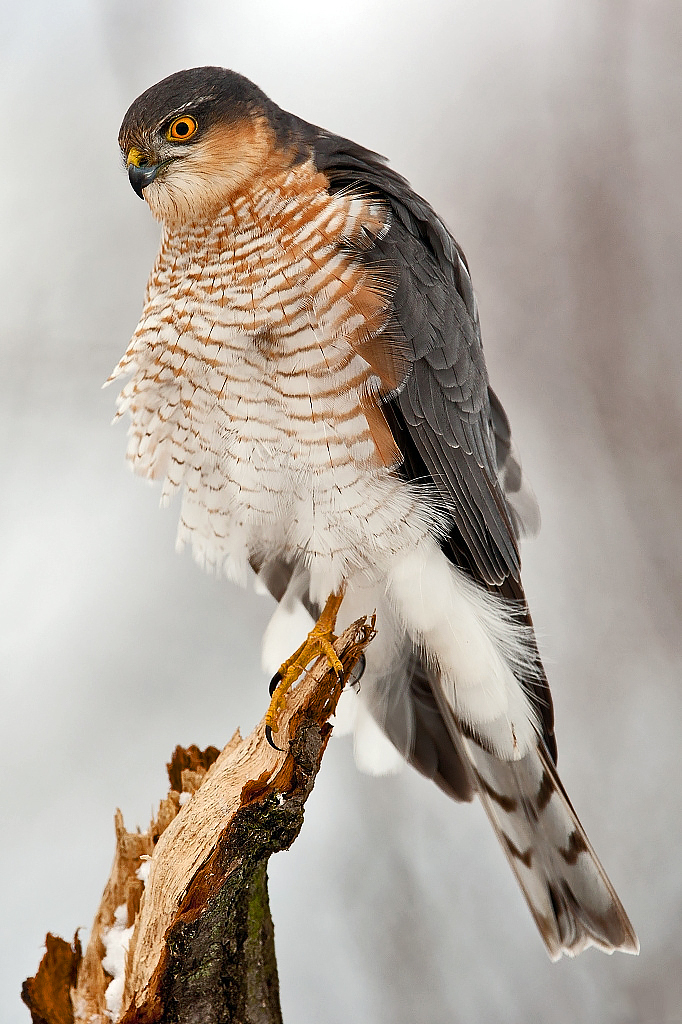
- Accipiter nisus

Scientific classification
- Kingdom: Animalia
- Phylum: Chordata
- Class: Aves
- Order: Accipitriformes
- Family: Accipitridae
- Subfamily: Accipitrinae
- Genus: Accipiter; Brisson, 1760

Type species
- Falco nisus Linnaeus, 1758

Synonyms
- Hieraspiza Kaup, 1844 (but see text)

= Accipiter =

Genus of birds

Accipiter (/ækˈsɪpɪtər/) is a genus of birds of prey in the family Accipitridae. Some species are called sparrowhawks, but there are many sparrowhawks in other genera such as Tachyspiza.

These birds are slender with short, broad, rounded wings and a long tail which helps them maneuver in flight. They have long legs and long, sharp talons used to kill their prey, and a sharp, hooked bill used in feeding. Females tend to be larger than males. They often ambush their prey, mainly small birds and mammals, capturing them after a short chase. The typical flight pattern is a series of flaps followed by a short glide. They are commonly found in wooded or shrubby areas.

The genus Accipiter was introduced by the French zoologist Mathurin Jacques Brisson in 1760. The type species is the Eurasian sparrowhawk (Accipiter nisus). The name is Latin for "hawk", from accipere, "to grasp".

== Procoracoid foramen ==
The procoracoid foramen (or coracoid foramen, coracoid fenestra) is a hole through the process at the front of the coracoid bone, which accommodates the supracoracoideus nerve. In some groups of birds it may be present as a notch, or incisura; or the notch may be partially or weakly closed with bone. In other groups the feature is completely absent.

The foramen is generally present in birds of prey, but it is absent in most Accipiter hawks that have been studied. This absence is proposed as a diagnostic feature.

A study of accipitrid skeletons found procoracoid incisurae (as opposed to foramina) in some specimens of the eagles Aquila gurneyi and A. chrysaetos, but not in four other Aquila species. The notch was variably open or weakly ossified in Spizastur melanoleucos, Lophoaetus occipitalis, Spizaetus ornatus, and Stephanoaetus coronatus. Also the buteonine hawks Buteo brachyurus and B. hemilasius had incisurae, differing from 17 other Buteo species.

In Circus the foramen was found to be variable, not only within species but even between sides in the same individual. It is usually open or absent but may be closed by "a thread of bone". Research in genetic phylogeny has since indicated that Circus is closely related to Accipiter.

The notch was also absent or indistinct in Harpagus bidentatus.

Urotriorchis macrourus has a well-developed procoracoid foramen, which suggests a separation from Accipiter. It may be related to the chanting goshawks in tribe Melieraxini.

== Taxonomy ==
The genus Accipiter formerly contained around 50 species. A series of molecular phylogenetic studies found that the traditional arrangement was non-monophyletic. The publication of a densely sampled study of the Accipitridae in 2024 allowed the generic boundaries to be redefined. To create monophyletic genera, species were moved from Accipiter to five new or resurrected genera leaving only 9 species in Accipiter. The southeast Asian crested goshawk and the Sulawesi goshawk were found to be only distantly related to other species in Accipiter. They were moved to a resurrected genus Lophospiza, the only genus placed in the new subfamily Lophospizinae. Similarly, the very small South American tiny hawk and semicollared hawk were found to be only distantly related to species in Accipiter. They were moved to a newly erected genus Microspizias which together with Harpagus is placed in the subfamily Harpaginae. The genera Circus, Megatriorchis, and Erythrotriorchis were found to be nested within Accipiter. Rather than subsuming these genera into an expanded Accipiter, species were moved from Accipiter to the resurrected genera Aerospiza, Tachyspiza and Astur.

== List of Accipiter species ==
There are 9 species in the Accipiter genus.

Genus Accipiter – Brisson, 1760 – nine species
Common name	Scientific name and subspecies	Range	Size and ecology	IUCN status and estimated population
Madagascar sparrowhawk	Accipiter madagascariensis (Smith, 1834)	Madagascar	Size: Habitat: Diet:	NT 3,300–6,700 ▼
Ovambo sparrowhawk	Accipiter ovampensis Gurney, 1875	Sub-Saharan Africa	Size: Habitat: Diet:	LC ▲
Eurasian sparrowhawk	Accipiter nisus (Linnaeus, 1758) Six subspecies: A. n. granti; A. n. melaschistos; A. n. nisosimilis; A. n. nisus; A. n. punicus; A. n. wolterstorffi	Europe and Asia	Size: Habitat: Diet:	LC 2,200,000–3,300,000
Rufous-breasted sparrowhawk	Accipiter rufiventris Smith, 1830 Two subspecies: A. r. perspicillaris - (Rüppell, 1836); A. r. rufiventris - Smith, A, 1830	Angola, Democratic Republic of the Congo, Eritrea, Eswatini, Ethiopia, Kenya, Lesotho, Malawi, Mozambique, Rwanda, South Africa, South Sudan, Tanzania, Uganda, Zambia, and Zimbabwe.	Size: Habitat: Diet:	LC ▲
Grey-bellied hawk	Accipiter poliogaster (Temminck, 1824)	eastern Colombia, southern Venezuela, the two Guyanas, Suriname, eastern Ecuador, central and eastern Peru, Amazonian Brazil, northern Bolivia, eastern Paraguay and northeast Argentina	Size: Habitat: Diet:	NT 1,000–10,000 ▲
Sharp-shinned hawk	Accipiter striatus Vieillot, 1808 Ten subspecies: A. s. chionogaster; A. s. erythronemius; A. s. fringilloides; A. s. madrensis; A. s. perobscurus; A. s. striatus; A. s. suttoni; A. s. velox; A. s. venator; A. s. ventralis	North America, Central America, South America and the Greater Antilles.	Size: Habitat: Diet:	LC ▲
White-breasted hawk	Accipiter chionogaster Kaup, 1852	Central America	Size: Habitat: Diet:	
Plain-breasted hawk	Accipiter ventralis PL Sclater, 1866	Venezuela, Colombia, Peru, Ecuador, Bolivia	Size: Habitat: Diet:	
Rufous-thighed hawk	Accipiter erythronemius Kaup, 1850	Bolivia, Brazil, Paraguay, Uruguay, Argentina	Size: Habitat: Diet:	
