= Ovambo =

Ovambo may refer to:

- Ovambo language, Bantu language of Namibia
  - Ovambo people, Bantu people of Namibia
- Ovamboland, former Bantustan in South West Africa (now Namibia)
- Ovambo sparrowhawk (Accipiter ovampensis), an African bird of prey
