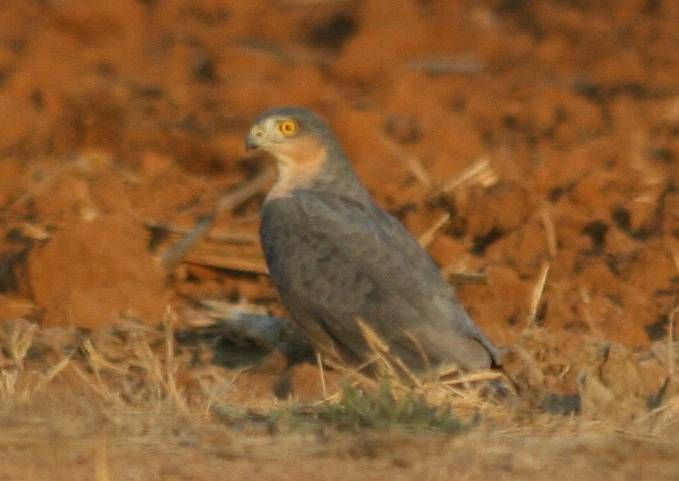
- Just after it had caught something in the late afternoon, Cedara Farm, Pietermaritzburg, KwaZulu-Natal, South Africa.

Conservation status
- Least Concern (IUCN 3.1)

Scientific classification
- Kingdom: Animalia
- Phylum: Chordata
- Class: Aves
- Order: Accipitriformes
- Family: Accipitridae
- Genus: Accipiter
- Species: A. rufiventris

Binomial name
- Accipiter rufiventris Smith, 1830

Subspecies
- A. r. perspicillaris - (Rüppell, 1836); A. r. rufiventris - Smith, A, 1830

= Rufous-breasted sparrowhawk =

Species of bird

The rufous-breasted sparrowhawk (Accipiter rufiventris), also known as the rufous-chested sparrowhawk and as the red-breasted sparrowhawk, is a species of bird of prey in the family Accipitridae. It is found in Angola, Democratic Republic of the Congo, Eritrea, Eswatini, Ethiopia, Kenya, Lesotho, Malawi, Mozambique, Rwanda, South Africa, South Sudan, Tanzania, Uganda, Zambia, and Zimbabwe.

== Description ==
A small raptor, with a height of about 30 cm and wingspan of 72 cm, the rufous-breasted sparrowhawk is named for its distinctive rufous-coloured underparts, which can be seen both perching and in flight. It is dark grey slate-brown above, including the head, with a black bill and eyes that are yellow at all ages.

In flight, the bold bars on both its wings and tail are clearly visible. Juvenile plumage ranges from the rufous-color of adults to more white, but all have feathers with dark shaft streaks on their underside. It can be differentiated from the similar Ovambo sparrowhawk (Accipiter ovampensis) by its lack of a dark patch behind the eyes or white eyebrow.

== Taxonomy ==
The rufous-breasted sparrowhawk is in the family Accipitridae, and is a part of the genus Accipiter, which contains sparrowhawks, goshawks, and other small woodland hawks. Within this genus it forms a superspecies with the Eurasian sparrowhawk (A. nisus) and possibly the Madagascar sparrowhawk (A. madagascariensis) (Ferguson-Lees and Christie 2001). Recent DNA barcoding research found it to be potentially conspecific with A. nisus, but did not support a superspecies with A. madagascariensis.

== Habitat and distribution ==
The rufous-breasted sparrowhawk has the most restricted range of any southern African accipiter, though it has expanded with the introduction of non-native pine species. It occupies montane forest habitats from the Cape of Good Hope to the Ethiopian highlands, though locally its range is quite small and divided between forest patches.

== Behavior ==
The rufous-breasted sparrowhawk shares many behavioral qualities with other African and European accipiters, but virtually nothing is known of its diet and nestling development.

=== Vocalization ===
Its call is a series of high, fast "kew" notes, with the male being higher-pitched than the female. A more drawn out "kieee-u" is made by the female to request food from the nearby male, and is adopted by the young as a begging call whenever adults are near.

=== Diet ===
Usually hunts on the wing for doves and other small birds, but may occasionally strike from a perch to feed on insects, small mammals (including bats) and reptiles.

=== Reproduction ===
Undergoes courtship by flying very high above the nesting area and calling, and mating often occurs after the male presents the female with an offer of food. Nests are platforms built from small sticks 6-18m above the ground, and are built by snapping off sticks in flight with their talons or by breaking them with their beak. A new nest is usually built each year, though often very close to the previous nesting site. Two to four eggs are laid in September and October, and are white with red-brown blotches that coalesce in a cap. Incubation is undergone primarily by the female, while the male fetches food, which is given to her in a nearby tree.
