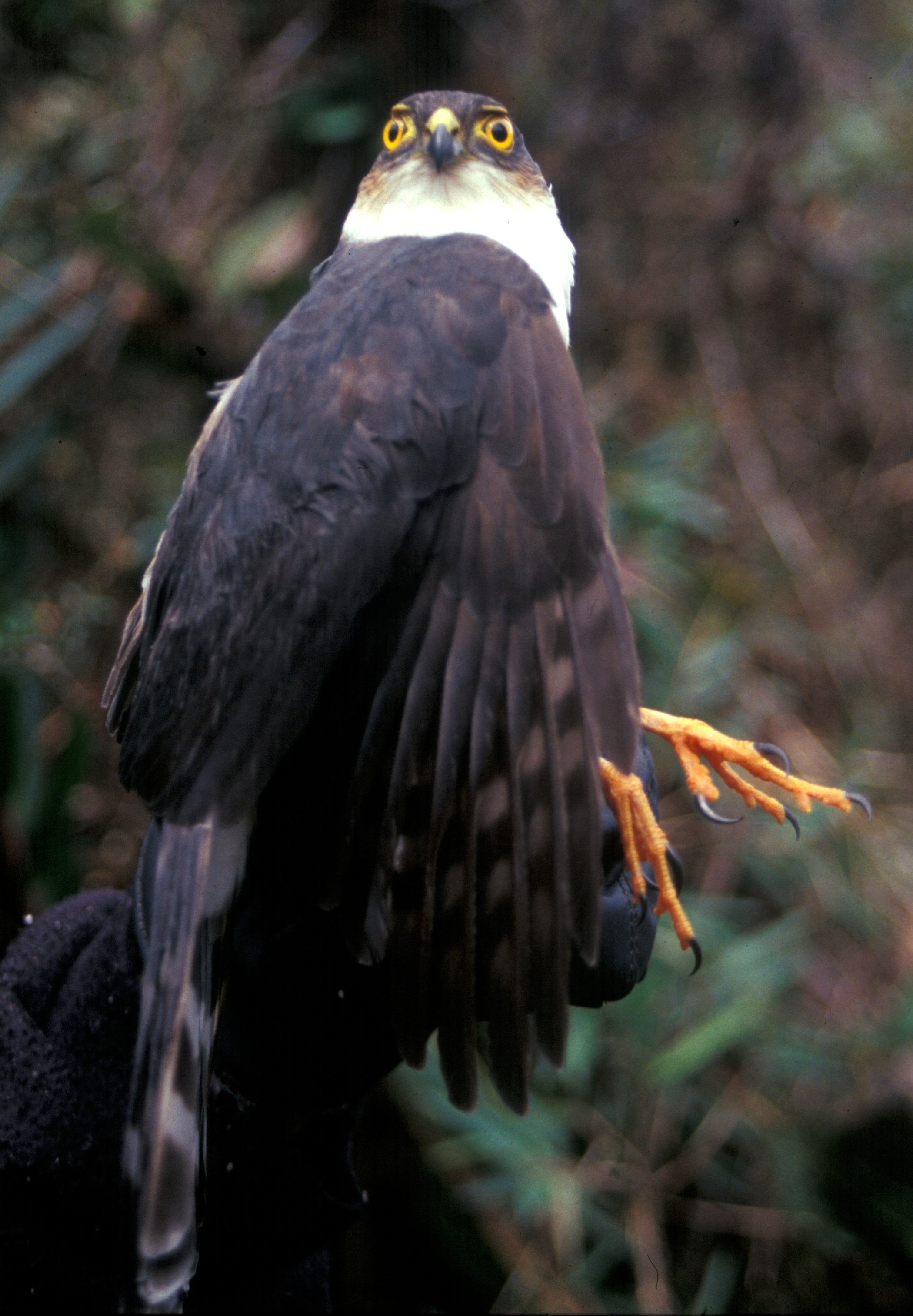

Scientific classification
- Domain: Eukaryota
- Kingdom: Animalia
- Phylum: Chordata
- Class: Aves
- Order: Accipitriformes
- Family: Accipitridae
- Genus: Accipiter
- Species: A. ventralis

Binomial name
- Accipiter ventralis PL Sclater, 1866

Synonyms
- Accipiter striatus ventralis

= Plain-breasted hawk =

Species of bird

The plain-breasted hawk (Accipiter ventralis) is a small hawk described from Venezuela to western Bolivia. It is usually considered a subspecies of the sharp-shinned hawk by most taxonomists, including the American Ornithological Society, but the taxonomy is far from resolved, with some authorities considering the southern taxa to represent three separate species: white-breasted hawk (A. chionogaster), plain-breasted hawk (A. ventralis), and rufous-thighed hawk (A. erythronemius).

== Taxonomy ==
The breeding range of the groups are entirely allopatric, although the wintering range of the nominate group partially overlaps with the range of chionogaster (as is also the case with certain taxa within the nominate group). This allopatry combined with differences in plumage (see appearance) and, apparently, certain measurements, has been the background for the split, but hard scientific data are presently lacking (AOU). Disregarding field guides, most material published in recent years (e.g. AOU, Ferguson-Lees et al. p. 586, and Dickinson et al.) has therefore considered all to be members of a single widespread species – but not without equivocation: Ferguson-Lees et al. say that if they were to make a world list, they would include the three taxa as separate species (p. 75), and the AOU's comment includes the note "split almost certainly good".

In Bolivia, ventralis and erythronemius approach each other, but no evidence of intergradation is known – something that, without actual specimens, also would be hard to prove due to the variability in the plumage of ventralis.

== Description ==
This is a small Accipiter hawk, with males 23 to 30 cm (9.1 to 11.8 in) long, with a wingspan of 42 to 58 cm (17 to 23 in) and weight from 82–115 g (2.9–4.1 oz). As common in Accipiter hawks, females are distinctly larger in size, averaging some 30% longer, and with a weight advantage of more than 50% being common. The female measures 29 to 37 cm (11 to 15 in) in length, has a wingspan of 58 to 68 cm (23 to 27 in) and weighs 150 to 219 g (5.3 to 7.7 oz). The wings measure 14.1–22.9 cm (5.6–9.0 in) each, the tail is 12–19 cm (4.7–7.5 in) long and the tarsus is 4.5–5.9 cm (1.8–2.3 in). Measurements given here are for sharp-shinned hawk, but they are comparable for the remaining species. Adults have short broad wings and a medium-length tail banded in blackish and gray with the tip varying among individuals from slightly notched through square to slightly rounded (often narrowly tipped white). The remiges (typically only visible in flight) are whitish barred blackish. The legs are long and very slender (hence the common name) and yellow. The hooked bill is black and the cere is yellowish.

Birds can be Polymorphic. The most common morph has dark grey upperparts (often appears almost black) and white underparts variably barred, shaded, or mottled with rufous or tawny-buff (extensively marked individuals may appear almost entirely rufous or tawny-buff below). Occasionally, the barring to the lower belly and flanks may appear duskier. The white morph has bluish-grey upperparts (similar to sharp-shinned hawk), but its underparts are all white except for its rufous thighs. The rare dark morph, the only morph which sometimes lacks rufous thighs, is entirely sooty (occasionally with slight white barring to belly and faint grey bands in tail). The underparts of the females average paler than males of the same morph. The iris is typically yellow (contra illustrations in some books), but individuals (mainly sub-adults?) with a darker iris are occasionally seen. Juveniles have dark brownish or dusky upperparts with each feather typically edged rufous, giving a rather scaly appearance. The underparts are white streaked brown, and the thighs are rufous barred white. Occasionally, juveniles with underparts extensively rufous streaked blackish are seen.

== Distribution ==
It occurs in the coastal mountains of northern Venezuela and Colombia, south through the Andes from western Venezuela, through Colombia, Ecuador and Peru, to central Bolivia. A disjunct population occurs in the Tepuis of southern Venezuela (likely to extend into adjacent parts of Roraima in far northern Brazil, but this remains unconfirmed). It is, as far as known, resident, but some local movements may occur.

== Habitat ==
The plain-breasted hawk is found in upper tropical to temperate highlands; mainly at altitudes of 300–3,000 m (980–9,840 ft), but occasionally down to near sea-level and up to 4,000 m (13,000 ft).

=== Diet ===
These birds surprise and capture most of their prey from cover or while flying quickly through dense vegetation. They are adept at navigating dense thickets, although this hunting method is often hazardous to the hawk. The great majority of this hawk's prey are small birds, especially various songbirds such as sparrows, wood-warblers, finches, wrens, nuthatches, tits, icterids and thrushes. Typically, males will target smaller birds, such as sparrows and wood-warblers, and females will pursue larger prey, such as thrushes and flickers, leading to a lack of conflict between the sexes for prey. These hawks often exploit backyard bird feeders in order to target congregations of ideal prey. They often pluck the feathers off their prey on a post or other perch. Rarely, sharp-shinned hawks will also eat rodents, lizards, frogs, snakes, and large insects.

=== Reproduction ===
Sharp-shinned hawks construct a stick nest. Clutches of 3 to 8 eggs have been recorded, but 4 to 5 eggs is the typical clutch size. The eggs measure 37.6 mm × 30 mm (1.48 in × 1.18 in) and weigh about 19 g (0.67 oz). The incubation period is thought to average at about 30 days. After hatching, the young are brooded for 16 to 23 days by the female, while the male defends the territory and catches prey. The young fledge at the age of about a month and rely on their parents for feeding and protection another four weeks. The breeding behavior of the plain-breasted hawk is comparably poorly known, but based on the available knowledge they appear to differ little from that of the sharp-shinned hawk.

== Conservation ==
The plain-breasted hawk is fairly common (but easily overlooked due to their secretive behavior) and presently considered safe.
