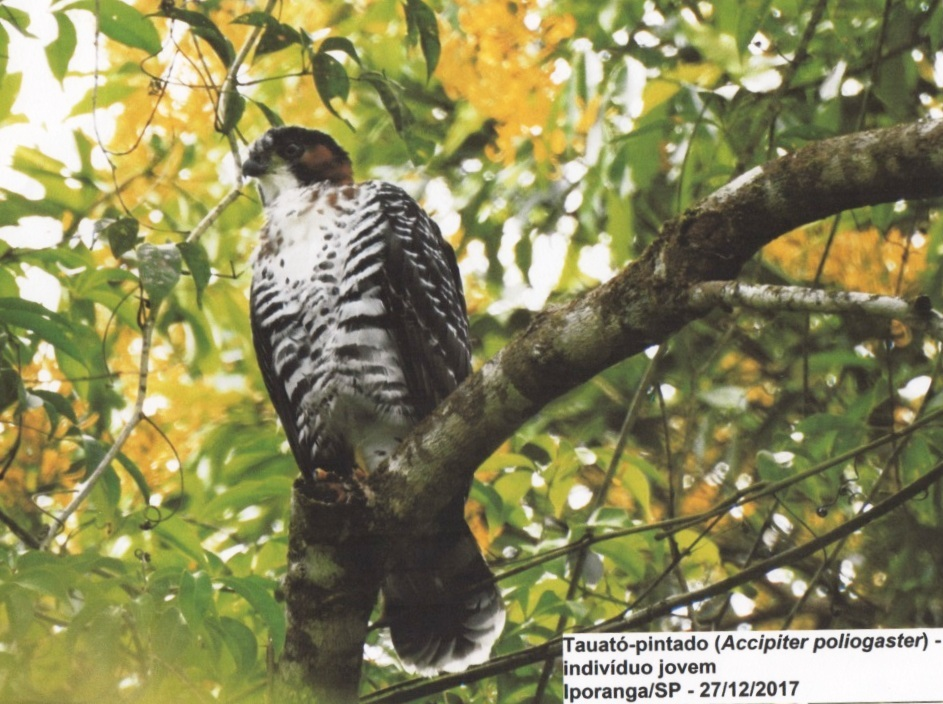

Conservation status
- Near Threatened (IUCN 3.1)

Scientific classification
- Kingdom: Animalia
- Phylum: Chordata
- Class: Aves
- Order: Accipitriformes
- Family: Accipitridae
- Genus: Accipiter
- Species: A. poliogaster

Binomial name
- Accipiter poliogaster (Temminck, 1824)
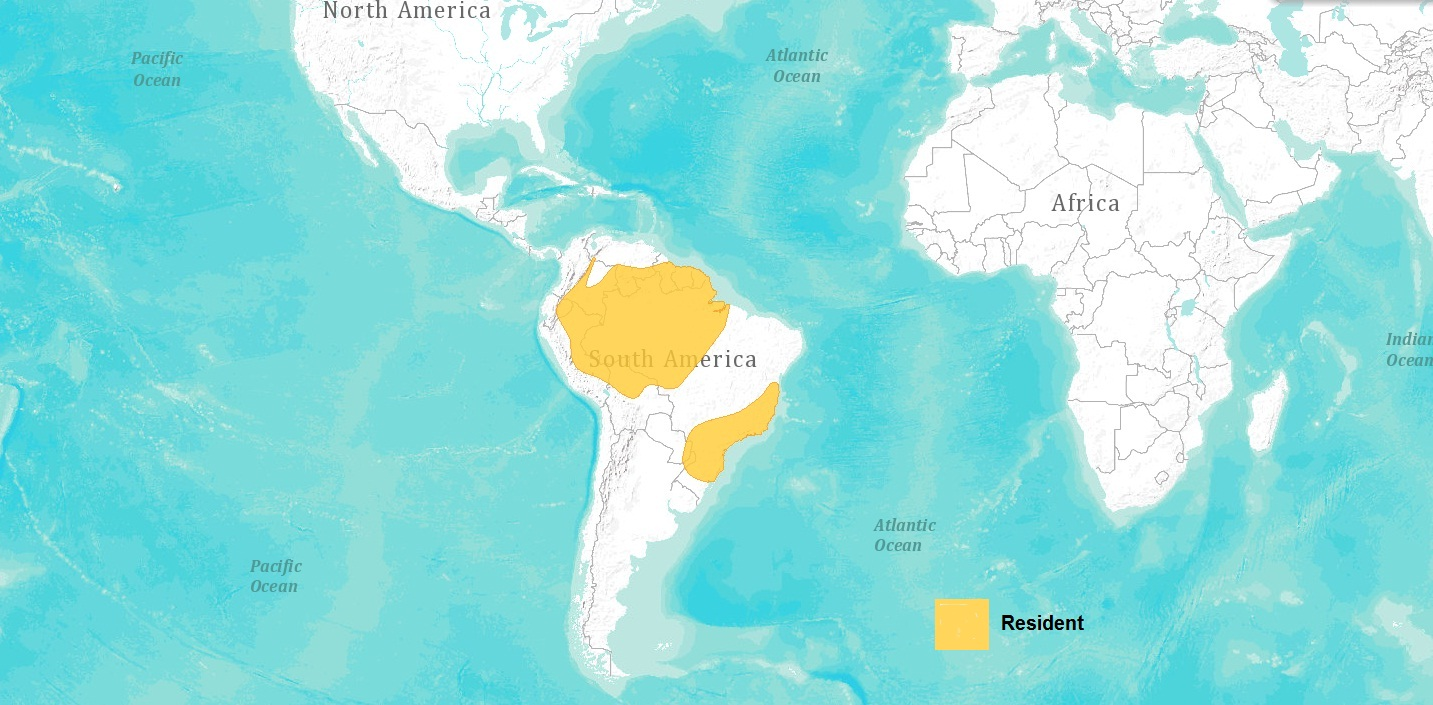
- Location where the grey-bellied hawk can be found (South America only)

= Grey-bellied hawk =

Species of bird

The grey-bellied hawk or grey-bellied goshawk (Accipiter poliogaster) is a fairly large and rare species of forest-dwelling South American bird of prey in the family Accipitridae.

== Taxonomy ==
Dutch naturalist Coenraad Jacob Temminck described the grey-bellied hawk in 1824.

== Description ==
This medium-sized hawk measures 38–51 cm in body length, with females being considerably larger (by about 40%) than males. Other body measurements in the male have been recorded as 232–270mm flat wing length, 165–187mm tail length, 18–21mm bill length from culmen to cere and tarsus length of 50–55mm;. Corresponding measurements in the female are 263–283mm flat wing length, 181–207mm tail length, 20–22mm bill length from culmen to cere and 53–60mm tarsus length.

The hawk's basic plumage is coloured black or dark grey above and contrasting white or grey on the throat and body underside below. As the common name suggests, the belly is pale grey. The head is black or very dark grey overall and extends halfway down the throat before suddenly becoming white, so as to give a "hooded" or "capped" appearance. In males, the crown is darker than the rest of the head, whereas the plumage on the back and head of the female is uniformly dark. White feathers on the nape are exposed and appear as white spots across the hindneck. The tail is black or grey with three wide light grey horizontal bands on top and a narrow white tip. The wings, legs and tail have been described as being relatively short for the body size, with a heavy bill and head.

The feet, legs, cere and orbital skin are yellow and the bill is black with a bluish grey base. The iris has been reported as yellow or red. Females are reported to have darker grey and the males light grey cheeks.

The plumage of juveniles has been said to resemble that of the ornate hawk eagle and have even previously considered a separate species (A. pectoralis).

In the field, the grey-bellied hawk is similar in size and shape to the collared forest falcon and slaty-backed forest falcon and is therefore often confused with these two other species, both of which however differ markedly from the grey-bellied hawk in colouration. This hawk is most often seen soaring over forests and utters a cackling kek-kek-kek-kek-kek-kek that trails off the end. Average lifespan is estimated at 7.2 years.

== Distribution and habitat ==
This hawk has a wide but patchy distribution in tropical lowland evergreen forests of South America at elevations of 250-500m a.s.l. It occurs in northern and eastern Colombia, southern Venezuela, the two Guyanas, Suriname, eastern Ecuador, central and eastern Peru, Amazonian Brazil, northern Bolivia, eastern Paraguay and northeast Argentina. In Ecuador, its occurrence is patchy and has been observed only in pristine forest habitats. In French Guiana, it has been observed in the lower canopy of both primary and recently logged forests. The hawk is also said to occur accidentally in Costa Rica, with the first adult being observed here in 2014 after reports of only juveniles. It may be expanding its range into Costa Rica with the increase in human-disturbed land, which this hawk appears to tolerate as a nesting habitat. In Costa Rica has been reported a few times and the most recent was July 3, 2023 at Boca Tapada. Alongside rainforest, this hawk is also found in patches of riparian forest, other dense woodland and sometimes in secondary forest. The total area of its occurrence is estimated at 7,490,000 square kilometres (2,890,000 sq mi). Despite its large range, it appears to occur only locally and is generally rare.

Although it is generally considered to be resident throughout its range, partial or full migration has been reported, with austral migration from the south toward the equator in winter reportedly occurring March–June. In Ecuador, it has been sighted year-round and is therefore considered a permanent resident here (Global Raptor Information Network, 2012); and was once observed over 500m a.s.l at San Isidro.

== Ecology ==
=== Feeding ===
Little is known about this hawk's feeding biology; although given its medium size, it is assumed to take fairly large prey. The majority of prey may comprise small passerines and tinamous (Tinamus sp.). A young armadillo was also once identified as a prey item brought to the nest for young. It has also been suggested to prey on arboreal lizards, tree frogs and large hygrophilous insects. This hawk is thought to be a still hunter. Instead of hunting by soaring, it probably perches in the forest canopy to wait for a passing prey.

=== Breeding ===
Breeding in this secretive hawk species has been observed and described only once in the field, which occurred in southern Brazil. It appears to nest in a manner typical for Neotropical Accipiter species, although grey-bellied hawk nestlings appear to stay longer in the nest (about 49 days) compared to nestlings of other hawk species. The single nest observed in Brazil constituted a platform built in the upper branches of a Parana pine. This tree may be the preferred nesting site because of dense accumulations of branches on top which may conceal the nest from potential predatory raptors. The clutch size in this nest comprised two eggs, with only a single nestling surviving and leaving the nest 49 days post-hatching.

Within a pair, the male hunts for food for the female to feed to the young; as for many other Accipiters. However, unlike in other Accipiter species, the female of the grey-bellied hawk does not bring food to the nestlings while they are growing.

== Threats ==
The forest habitat of this hawk species is primarily threatened by increased deforestation in the Amazon Basin; and the species' patchy distribution makes it susceptible to population fragmentation. However, it does appear somewhat tolerant of habitat disturbance since it has been observed foraging and nesting in degraded habitat. Nevertheless, the population is projected to decline because of the species susceptibility to being hunted and trapped; and habitat disturbance may more likely negatively affect the population. Its rarity may also be partly attributable to competition with Micrastur forest falcons.

== Status ==
The grey-bellied hawk is evaluated as Near Threatened by the IUCN. It was uplisted from Least Concern in 2012 given projected future population declines in view of ongoing deforestation in the Amazon. The overall population is estimated at 1000–10000 individuals.
