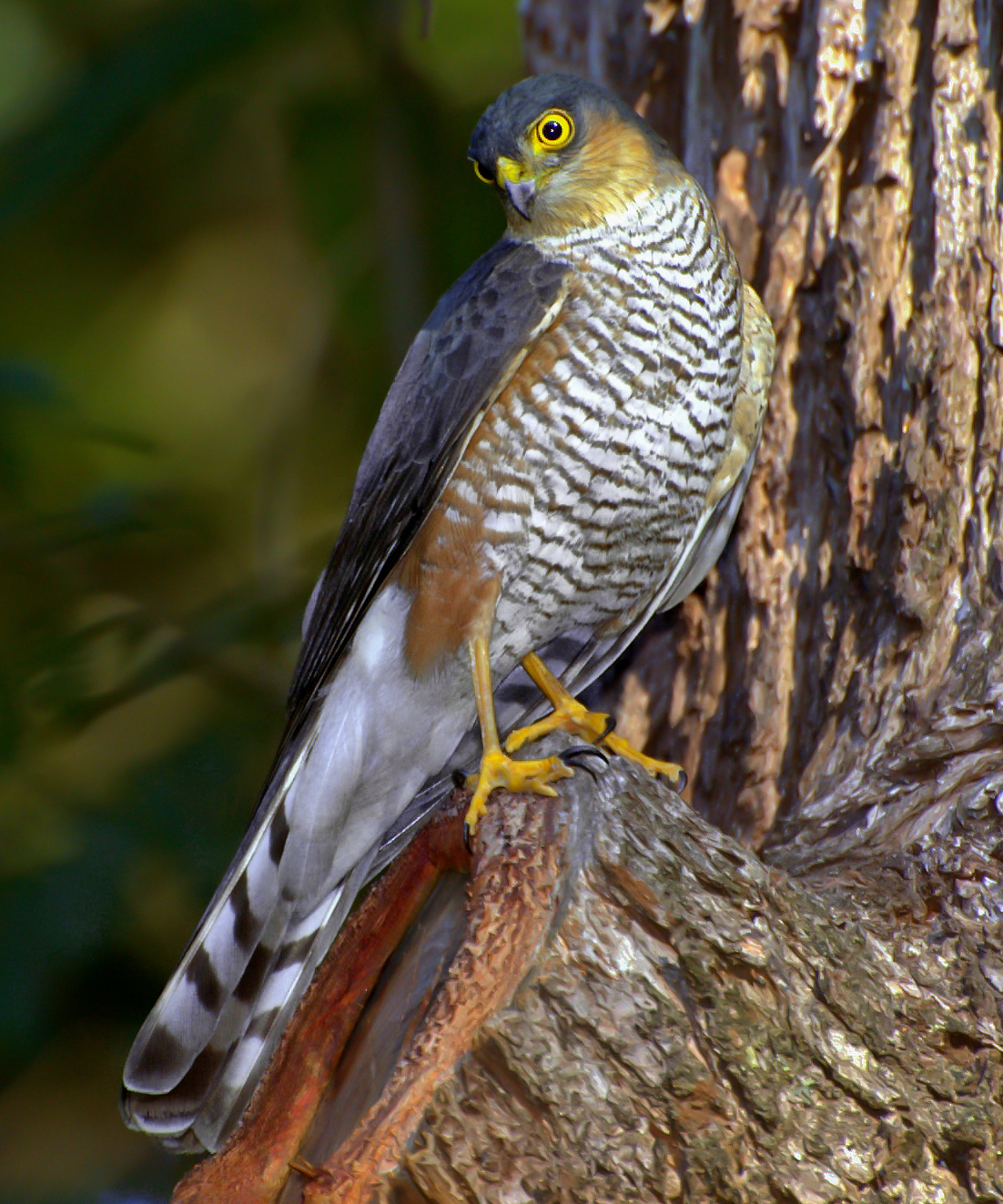

Scientific classification
- Kingdom: Animalia
- Phylum: Chordata
- Class: Aves
- Order: Accipitriformes
- Family: Accipitridae
- Genus: Accipiter
- Species: A. erythronemius

Binomial name
- Accipiter erythronemius (Kaup, 1850)

Synonyms
- Accipiter striatus erythronemius

= Rufous-thighed hawk =

Species of bird

The rufous-thighed hawk (Accipiter erythronemius) is a small hawk found from southern Brazil and southeastern Bolivia to Paraguay, Uruguay and northern Argentina. It is usually considered a subspecies of the sharp-shinned hawk by most taxonomists, including the American Ornithological Society, but the taxonomy is far from resolved, with some authorities considering the southern taxa to represent three separate species: white-breasted hawk (A. chionogaster), plain-breasted hawk (A. ventralis), and rufous-thighed hawk (A. erythronemius).

== Taxonomy ==
The breeding ranges of the rufous-thighed and sharp-shinned hawk is entirely allopatric. This allopatry combined with differences in plumage (see appearance) and, apparently, certain measurements, has been the background for the split, but hard scientific data are presently lacking (AOU).

== Description ==
This is a small Accipiter hawk, with males 23 to 30 cm (9.1 to 11.8 in) long, with a wingspan of 42 to 58 cm (17 to 23 in) and weight from 82–115 g (2.9–4.1 oz). As common in Accipiter hawks, females are distinctly larger in size, averaging some 30% longer, and with a weight advantage of more than 50% being common. The female measures 29 to 37 cm (11 to 15 in) in length, has a wingspan of 58 to 68 cm (23 to 27 in) and weighs 150 to 219 g (5.3 to 7.7 oz). The wings measure 14.1–22.9 cm (5.6–9.0 in) each, the tail is 12–19 cm (4.7–7.5 in) long and the tarsus is 4.5–5.9 cm (1.8–2.3 in). Measurements given here are for the sharp-shinned hawk, but they are comparable for the remaining species.

Adults have short broad wings and a medium-length tail banded in blackish and gray with the tip varying among individuals from slightly notched through square to slightly rounded (often narrowly tipped white). The remiges (typically only visible in flight) are whitish barred blackish. The legs are long and very slender (hence the common name) and yellow. The hooked bill is black and the cere is yellowish.

The rufous-thighed hawk resembles the sharp-shinned hawk, but upperparts are darker, streaking to underparts rufous or dusky, cheeks are typically with a clear rufous patch (occasionally lacking almost entirely) and iris is yellow (contra illustrations in some books). Juveniles resemble juveniles of sharp-shinneds, but streaking to the underparts are typically restricted to throat and central underparts, with flanks scaled or barred (often also the belly).

== Distribution ==
The species is found in Uruguay, Paraguay, north-eastern Argentina and south-eastern Bolivia. It is, as far as known, resident in some regions and migratory in others. The movements are generally poorly understood, but it only occurs seasonally at some localities in Argentina. The rufous-thighed hawk is found in tropical and subtropical regions; both in lowlands and highlands.

=== Diet ===
These birds surprise and capture most of their prey from cover or while flying quickly through dense vegetation. They are adept at navigating dense thickets, although this hunting method is often hazardous to the hawk. The great majority of this hawk's prey are small birds, especially various songbirds such as sparrows, wood-warblers, finches, wrens, nuthatches, tits, icterids and thrushes. Typically, males will target smaller birds, such as sparrows and wood-warblers, and females will pursue larger prey, such as thrushes and flickers, leading to a lack of conflict between the sexes for prey. They often pluck the feathers off their prey on a post or other perch. Rarely, rufous-thighed hawks will also eat rodents, lizards, frogs, snakes, and large insects.

=== Reproduction ===
Rufous-thighed hawks construct a stick nest. Clutches of 3 to 8 eggs have been recorded, but 4 to 5 eggs is the typical clutch size. The eggs measure 37.6 mm × 30 mm (1.48 in × 1.18 in) and weigh about 19 g (0.67 oz). The incubation period is thought to average at about 30 days. After hatching, the young are brooded for 16 to 23 days by the female, while the male defends the territory and catches prey. The young fledge at the age of about a month and rely on their parents for feeding and protection another four weeks. The breeding behavior of the rufous-thighed hawk is comparably poorly known, but based on the available knowledge they appear to differ little from that of sharp-shinned hawks.

== Conservation ==
The rufous-thighed hawk is fairly common (but easily overlooked due to their secretive behavior) and presently considered safe.
