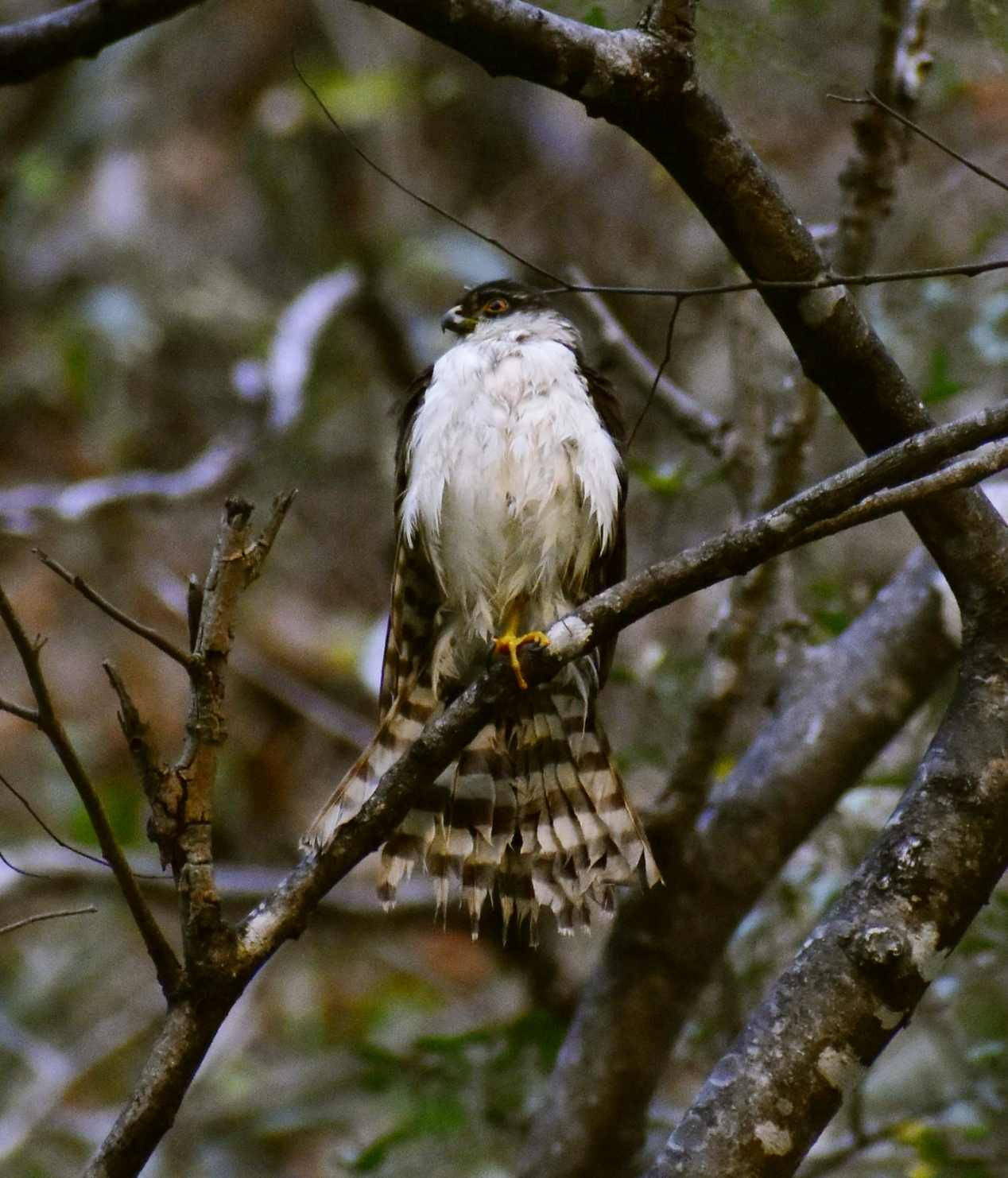

Scientific classification
- Kingdom: Animalia
- Phylum: Chordata
- Class: Aves
- Order: Accipitriformes
- Family: Accipitridae
- Genus: Accipiter
- Species: A. chionogaster

Binomial name
- Accipiter chionogaster (Kaup, 1852)

Synonyms
- Accipiter striatus chionogaster

= White-breasted hawk =

Species of bird

The white-breasted hawk (Accipiter chionogaster) is a small hawk found from southern Mexico to Nicaragua. It is usually considered a subspecies of the sharp-shinned hawk by most taxonomists, including the American Ornithological Society, but the taxonomy is far from resolved, with some authorities considering the southern taxa to represent three separate species: white-breasted hawk (A. chionogaster), plain-breasted hawk (A. ventralis), and rufous-thighed hawk (A. erythronemius).

== Taxonomy ==
The breeding range of the white-breasted hawk and the sharp-shinned hawk is entirely allopatric, although the wintering range only partially overlaps. This allopatry combined with differences in plumage (see appearance) and, apparently, certain measurements, has been the background for the split, but hard scientific data is presently lacking (AOU). Disregarding field guides, most material published in recent years (e.g. AOU, Ferguson-Lees et al. p. 586, and Dickinson et al.) has therefore considered all to be members of a single widespread species – but not without equivocation: Ferguson-Lees et al. say that if they were to make a world list, they would include the three taxa as separate species (p. 75), and the AOU's comment includes the note "split almost certainly good".

Storer (1952) suggested that the southernmost populations of sharp-shinned hawk were paler below, thus approaching chionogaster. This has also been reflected in recent guides, where A. s. madrensis of southern Mexico is described as being relatively pale below (compared to more northern subspecies), but if this is a sign of intergradation with chionogaster or a north-south cline which includes both the members of the nominate group and chionogaster remains unclear.

The two syntype specimens of Nisus (seu Accipiter) chionogaster Kaup (Proc. Zool. Soc. London, 1851, p.41.) are held in the collections of National Museums Liverpool at World Museum, with accession numbers D392 (female adult) and D392a (male adult). The specimens were collected in Cobán, Guatemala in June 1843 by Adolphe Delattre and came to the Liverpool national collection via the 13th Earl of Derby’s collection which was bequeathed to the city of Liverpool.

== Description ==
This is a small Accipiter hawk, with males 23 to 30 cm (9.1 to 11.8 in) long, with a wingspan of 42 to 58 cm (17 to 23 in) and weight from 82–115 g (2.9–4.1 oz). As common in Accipiter hawks, females are distinctly larger in size, averaging some 30% longer, and with a weight advantage of more than 50% being common. The female measures 29 to 37 cm (11 to 15 in) in length, has a wingspan of 58 to 68 cm (23 to 27 in) and weighs 150 to 219 g (5.3 to 7.7 oz). The wings measure 14.1–22.9 cm (5.6–9.0 in) each, the tail is 12–19 cm (4.7–7.5 in) long and the tarsus is 4.5–5.9 cm (1.8–2.3 in). Measurements given here are for the northern group, but they are comparable for the remaining species in the group. Adults have short broad wings and a medium-length tail banded in blackish and gray with the tip varying among individuals from slightly notched through square to slightly rounded (often narrowly tipped white). The remiges (typically only visible in flight) are whitish barred blackish. The legs are long and very slender (hence the common name) and yellow. The hooked bill is black and the cere is yellowish. The remaining plumage varies depending on group:

The white-breasted hawk resembles the sharp-shinned hawk, but upperparts darker (often appears almost black), thighs whitish-buff and underparts and cheeks entirely white. Juveniles have darker upperparts and distinctly finer streaking below than juveniles of the nominate group.

== Distribution ==
It occurs in highlands from far southern Mexico (Chiapas and Oaxaca), through Honduras, Guatemala and El Salvador, to Nicaragua. It is, as far as known, resident, but some local movements may occur.

== Habitat ==
They are most commonly found in pine and pine-oak habitats, regularly visiting neighbouring cloud forest, tropical dry forest and farmland; mainly at altitudes of 300–3,000 m (980–9,840 ft).

=== Diet ===
These birds surprise and capture most of their prey from cover or while flying quickly through dense vegetation. They are adept at navigating dense thickets, although this hunting method is often hazardous to the hawk. The great majority of this hawk's prey are small birds, especially various songbirds such as wood-warblers, wrens, and thrushes. Typically, males will target smaller birds, such as wood-warblers, and females will pursue larger prey, such as doves, leading to a lack of conflict between the sexes for prey. They often pluck the feathers off their prey on a post or other perch. Rarely, white-breasted hawks will also eat lizards, bats, and large insects.

=== Reproduction ===
White-breasted hawks construct a stick nest. Clutches of 2 to 4 eggs have been recorded. The eggs measure 38 mm × 31 mm (1.5 in × 1.2 in) and weigh about 19 g (0.67 oz). The incubation period is thought to average at about 30 days. After hatching, the young are brooded for 16 to 23 days by the female, while the male defends the territory and catches prey. The young fledge at the age of about a month and rely on their parents for feeding and protection another four weeks. The breeding behavior of the taxa are comparably poorly known, but based on the available knowledge they appear to differ little from that of the sharp-shinned hawk.

== Conservation ==
The situation for white-breasted hawk is more problematic due to its limited range, although it, at least locally, remains fairly common.
