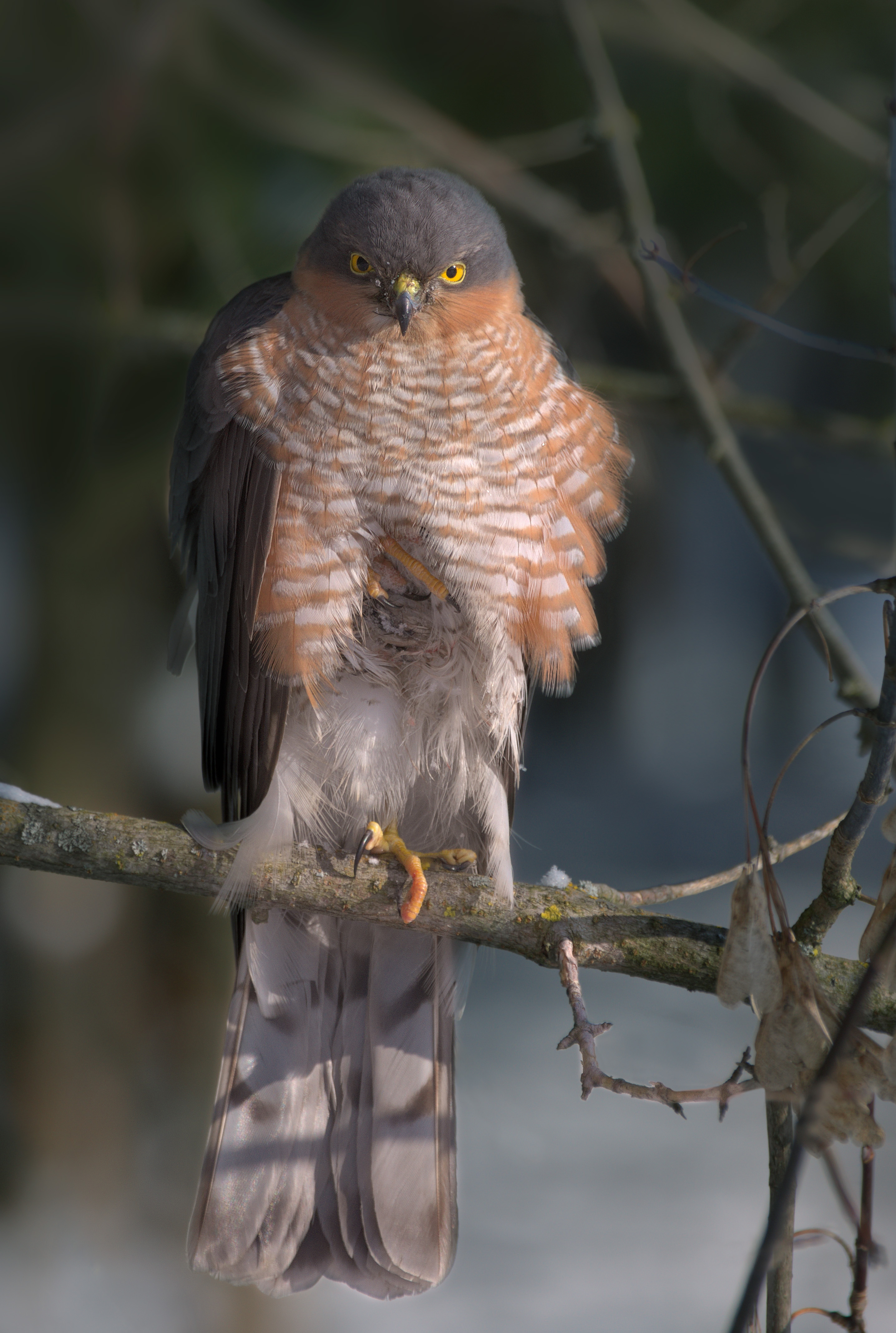
- Male
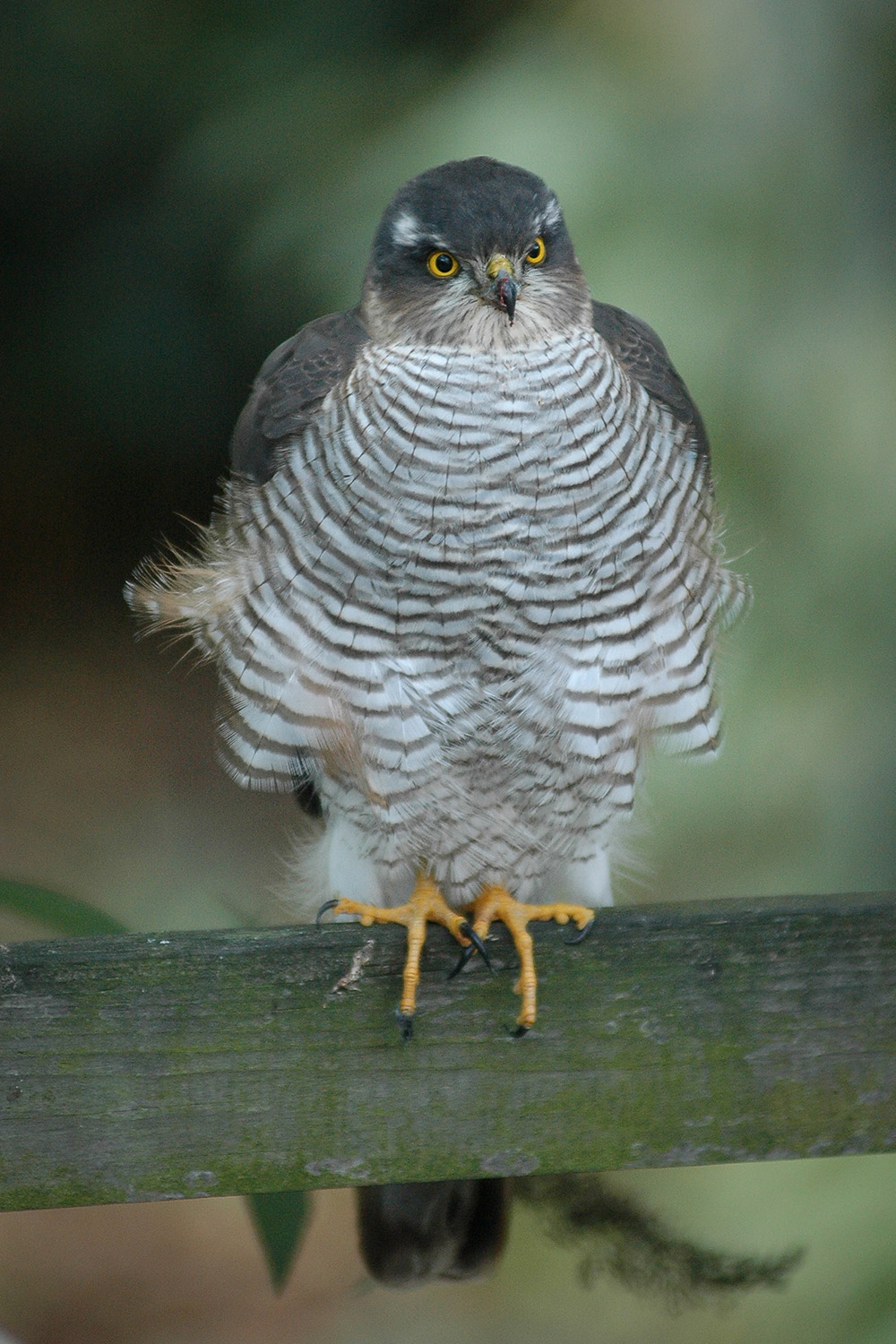
- Female

Conservation status
- Least Concern (IUCN 3.1)

Scientific classification
- Kingdom: Animalia
- Phylum: Chordata
- Class: Aves
- Order: Accipitriformes
- Family: Accipitridae
- Genus: Accipiter
- Species: A. nisus

Binomial name
- Accipiter nisus (Linnaeus, 1758)

Subspecies
- A. n. granti A. n. melaschistos A. n. nisosimilis A. n. nisus A. n. punicus A. n. wolterstorffi
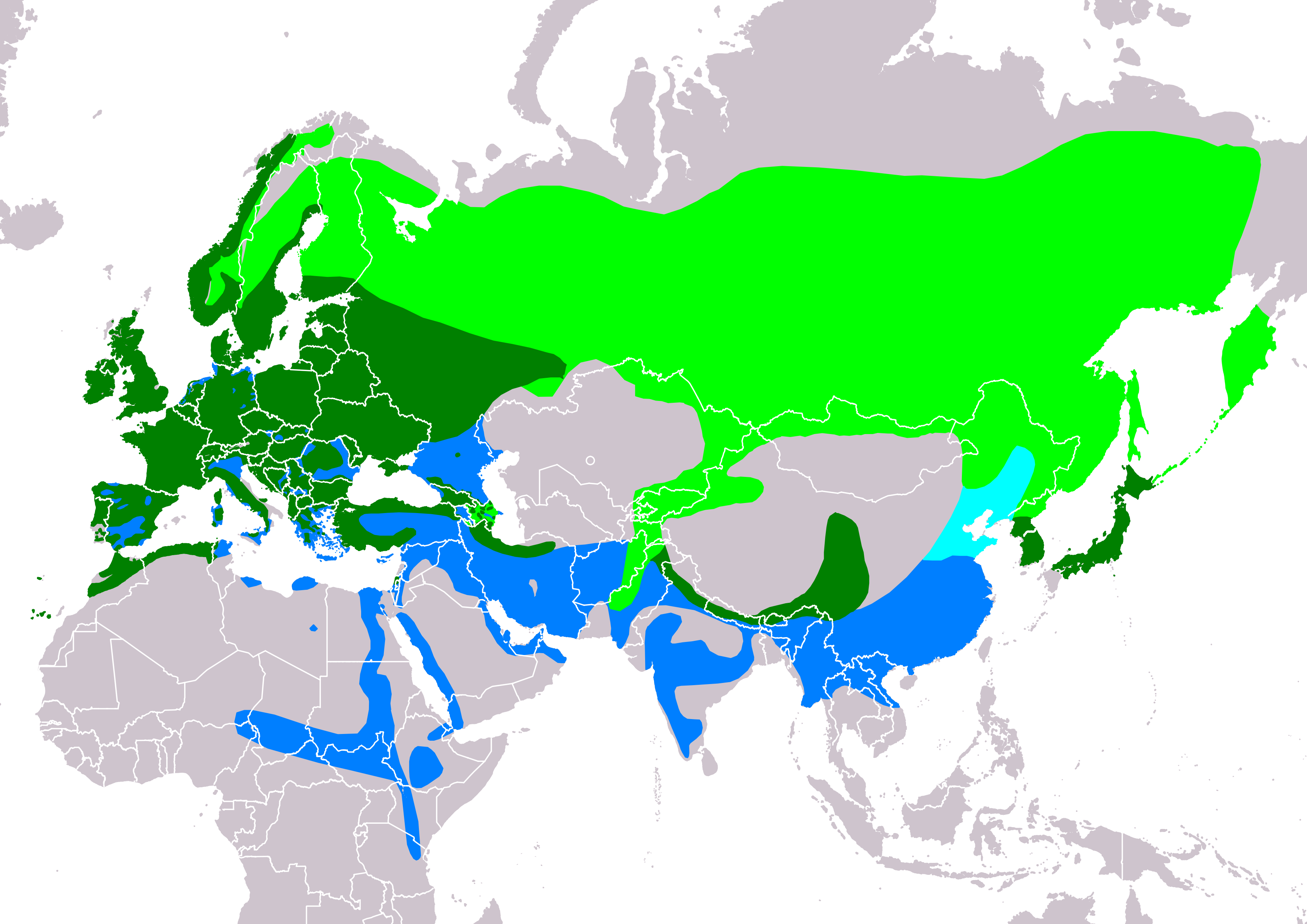
- Range of A. nisus Breeding Resident Non-breeding Passage

Synonyms
- Falco nisus Linnaeus, 1758

= Eurasian sparrowhawk =

Eurasian sparrowhawk Temporal range: Pleistocene–Present

Species of bird

Northern sparrowhawk call

The Eurasian sparrowhawk (Accipiter nisus), also known as the northern sparrowhawk or simply the sparrowhawk, is a small bird of prey in the family Accipitridae. Adult male Eurasian sparrowhawks have bluish grey upperparts and orange-barred underparts; females and juveniles are brown above with brown barring below. The female is up to 25% larger than the male – one of the greatest size differences between the sexes in any bird species. Though it is a predator which specialises in catching woodland birds, the Eurasian sparrowhawk can be found in any habitat and often hunts garden birds in towns and cities. Males tend to take smaller birds, including tits, finches and sparrows; females catch primarily thrushes and starlings but are capable of killing birds weighing 500 g (18 oz) or more.

The Eurasian sparrowhawk is found throughout the temperate and subtropical parts of the Old World; whilst birds from the northern parts of the range migrate south for winter, their southern counterparts remain resident or make dispersive movements. Eurasian sparrowhawks breed in suitable woodland of any type, with the nest, measuring up to 60 cm (24 in) across, built using twigs in a tree. Four or five pale blue, brown-spotted eggs are laid; the success of the breeding attempt is dependent on the female maintaining a high weight while the male brings her food. The chicks hatch after 33 days and fledge after 24 to 28 days.

The probability of a juvenile surviving its first year is 34%, with 69% of adults surviving from one year to the next. Mortality in young males is greater than that of young females and the typical lifespan is four years. This species is now one of the most common birds of prey in Europe, although the population crashed after the Second World War. Organochlorine insecticides used to treat seeds before sowing built up in the bird population, and the concentrations in Eurasian sparrowhawks were enough to kill some outright and incapacitate others; affected birds laid eggs with fragile shells, which broke during incubation. However, its population recovered after the chemicals were banned, and it is now relatively common, classified as being of least concern by BirdLife International.

The Eurasian sparrowhawk's hunting behaviour has brought it into conflict with humans for hundreds of years, particularly racing pigeon owners and people rearing poultry and gamebirds. It has also been blamed for decreases in passerine populations. Studies of racing-pigeon deaths found that Eurasian sparrowhawks were responsible for less than 1%. Falconers have utilised the Eurasian sparrowhawk since at least the 16th century; although the species has a reputation for being difficult to train, it is also praised for its courage. The species features in Teutonic mythology and is mentioned in works by writers including William Shakespeare, Alfred, Lord Tennyson and Ted Hughes.

== Taxonomy ==
Within the family Accipitridae, the Eurasian sparrowhawk is a member of the large genus Accipiter, which consists of small to medium-sized woodland hawks. Most of the Old World members of the genus are called sparrowhawks or goshawks. The species' name dates back to the Middle English word sperhauk and Old English spearhafoc, a hawk which hunts sparrows. The Old Norse name for the Eurasian sparrowhawk, sparrhaukr, was thought to have been coined by Vikings who encountered falconry in England. English folk names for the Eurasian sparrowhawk include blue hawk, referring to the adult male's colouration, as well as hedge hawk, spar hawk, spur hawk and stone falcon.

The Eurasian sparrowhawk was described by Carl Linnaeus in his 1758 landmark 10th edition of Systema Naturae as Falco nisus, but moved to its present genus by French zoologist Mathurin Jacques Brisson in 1760. The current scientific name is derived from the Latin accipiter, meaning 'hawk', and nisus, the sparrowhawk. According to Greek mythology Nisus, the king of Megara, was turned into a sparrowhawk after his daughter, Scylla, cut off his purple lock of hair to present to her lover (and Nisus' enemy), Minos.

The Eurasian sparrowhawk forms a superspecies with the rufous-chested sparrowhawk of eastern and southern Africa, and possibly the Madagascar sparrowhawk. Geographic variation is clinal, with birds becoming larger and paler in the eastern part of the range compared to the western part. Within the species itself, six subspecies are generally recognised:

- A. n. nisus, the nominate subspecies, was described by Linnaeus in 1758. It breeds from Europe and West Asia to western Siberia and Iran; northern populations winter south to the Mediterranean, Northeast Africa, Arabia and Pakistan.
- A. n. nisosimilis was described by Samuel Tickell in 1833. It breeds from central and eastern Siberia east to Kamchatka and Japan, and south to northern China. This subspecies is wholly migratory, wintering from Pakistan and India eastwards through Southeast Asia and southern China to Korea and Japan; some even reach Africa. It is very similar to, but slightly larger than, the nominate subspecies.
- A. n. melaschistos was described by Allan Octavian Hume in 1869. It breeds in mountains from Afghanistan through the Himalayas and southern Tibet to western China, and winters in the plains of South Asia. Larger and longer-tailed than nisosimilis, it has dark slate-coloured upperparts, and more distinct rufous barring on the underparts.
- A. n. wolterstorffi, described by Otto Kleinschmidt in 1900, is resident in Sardinia and Corsica. It is the smallest of all the subspecies, darker on the upperparts and more barred below than the nominate subspecies.
- A. n. granti, described by Richard Bowdler Sharpe in 1890, is confined to Madeira and the Canary Islands. It is small and dark.
- A. n. punicus, described by Erlanger in 1897, is resident in Northwest Africa north of the Sahara. It is very similar to nisus, being large and pale.

== Description ==
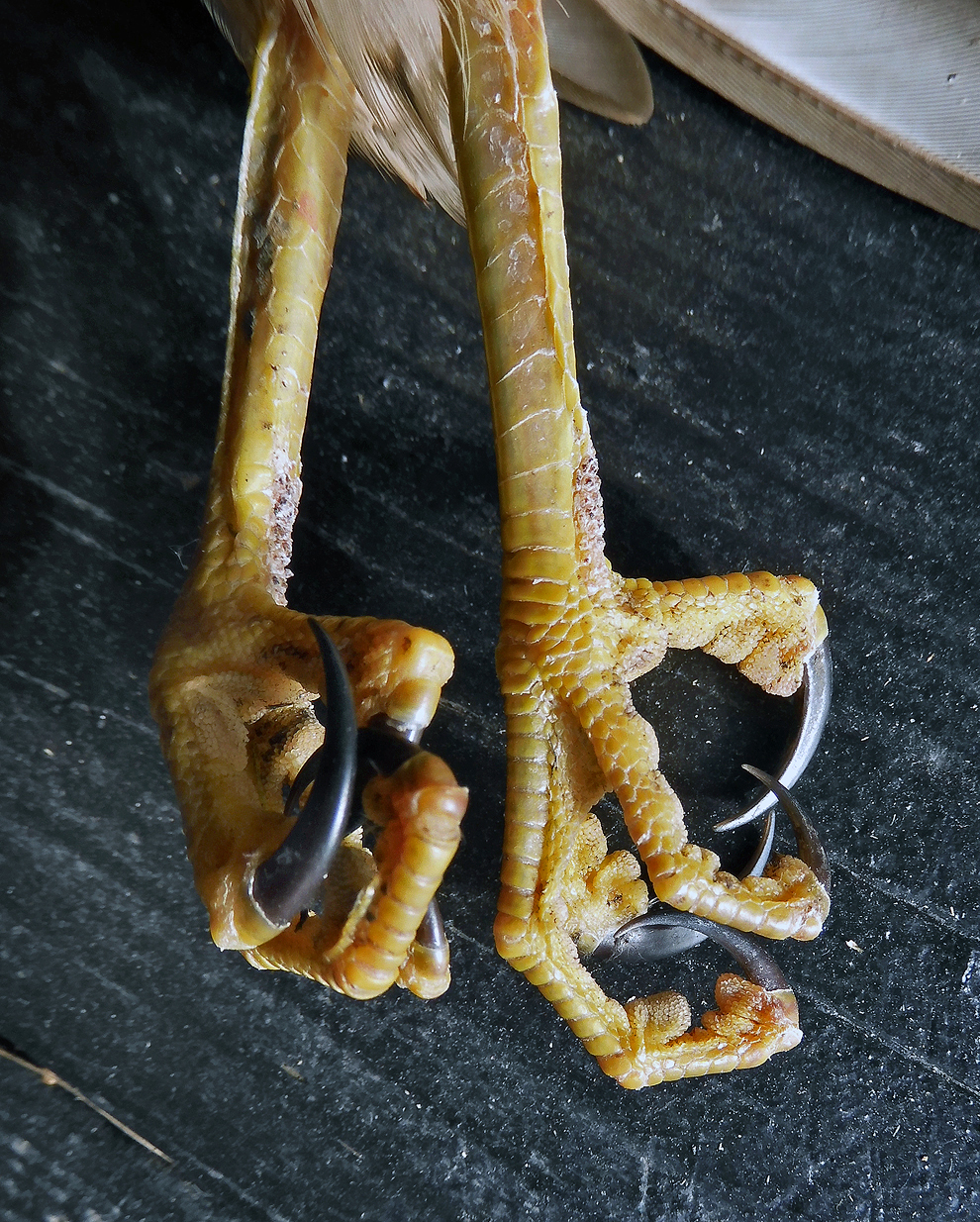
Claws of Eurasian sparrowhawk

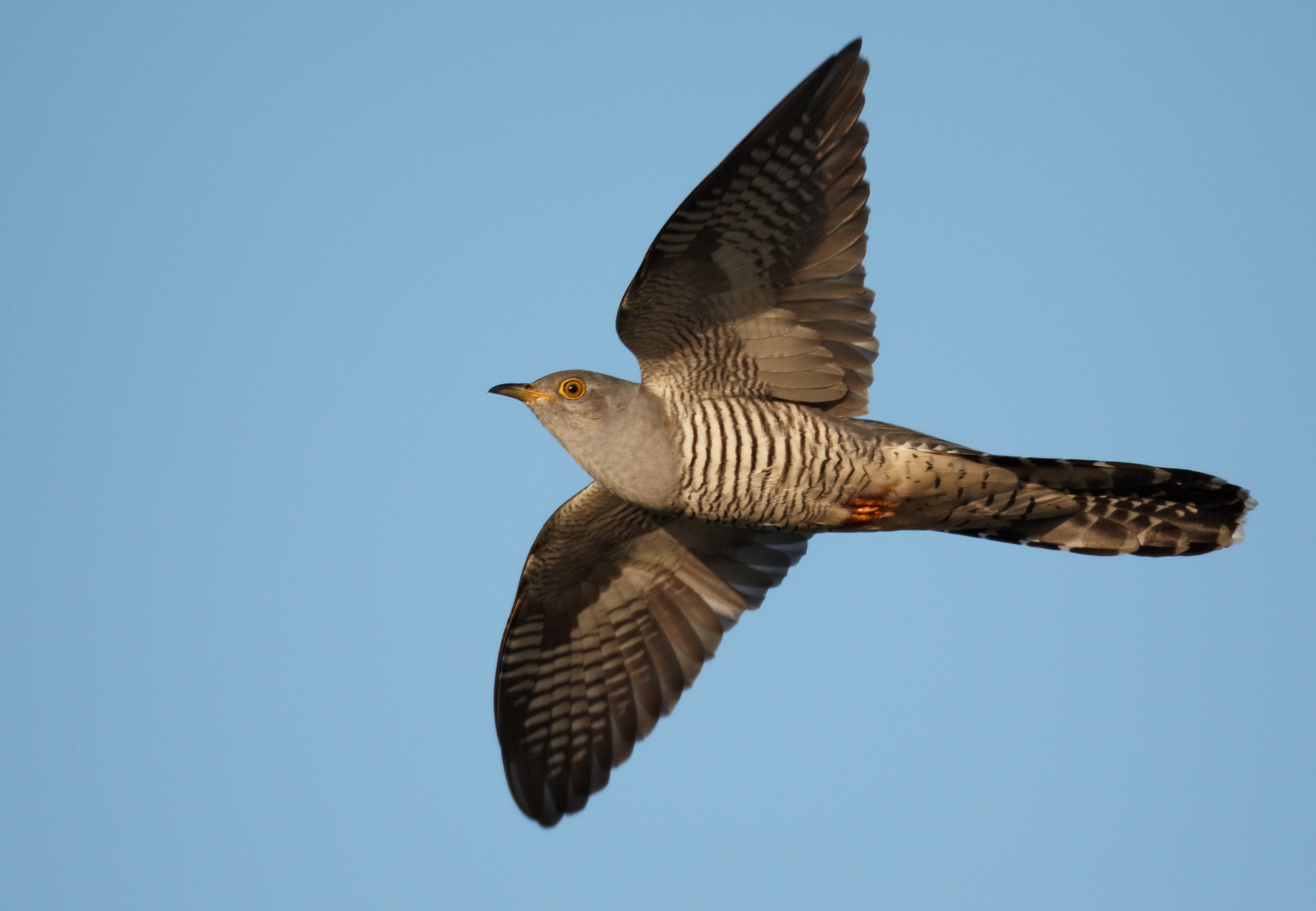
The resemblance of the common cuckoo (Cuculus canorus) to the Eurasian sparrowhawk helps it avoid aggression from the small birds whose nest it seeks to parasitise.

The Eurasian sparrowhawk is a small bird of prey with short, broad wings and a long tail, both adaptations to manoeuvring through trees. Females can be up to 25% larger than males and weigh up to twice as much. Marked size difference in this direction is unusual in higher vertebrates but typical in birds of prey, and most marked in birds of prey which hunt other birds.

The adult male is 29–34 cm (11–13 in) long, with a wingspan of 59–64 cm (23–25 in) and a mass of 110–196 g (3.9–6.9 oz). He has slate-grey upperparts (sometimes tending to bluish), with finely red-barred underparts, which can look plain orange from a distance; his irides are orange-yellow or orange-red. The female is much larger at 35–41 cm (14–16 in) long, with a wingspan of 67–80 cm (26–31 in), and a mass of 185–342 g (6.5–12.1 oz). She has dark brown or greyish-brown upperparts, brown-barred underparts and bright yellow to orange irides. The juvenile is warm brown above, with rusty fringes to the upperparts, and coarsely barred or spotted brown below, with pale yellow eyes; its throat has dark streaks and lacks a mesial (midline) stripe.

The Eurasian sparrowhawk's pale underparts and darker upperparts are an example of countershading, which helps to break up the bird's outline. Countershading is exhibited by birds of prey that hunt birds and other fast-moving animals. The horizontal barring seen on adult Eurasian sparrowhawks is typical of woodland-dwelling predatory birds and the adult male's bluish colour is also seen in other bird-eating raptors, including the peregrine falcon, the merlin and other Accipiters.

A study using stuffed bird models found that small birds are less likely to approach common cuckoos (a brood parasite), which have barred underparts like the Eurasian sparrowhawk. Eurasian reed warblers were found to be more aggressive to cuckoos which looked less hawk-like, meaning that the resemblance to the hawk (mimicry) helps the cuckoo to access the nests of potential hosts.

The Eurasian sparrowhawk's small bill is used for plucking feathers and pulling prey apart rather than killing or cutting. Its long legs and toes are an adaptation for catching and eating birds. The outer toe is fairly long and slender; the inner toe and back toe are relatively short and thick. The middle toe is very long and can be used to grasp objects, and a protuberance on the underside of the toe means that the digit can be closed without leaving a gap, which helps with gripping.

The flight is a characteristic flap-flap-glide, with the glide creating an undulating pattern. This species is similar in size to the Levant sparrowhawk, but larger than the shikra (the calls are however different); the male is only slightly larger than the merlin. Because of the overlap in sizes, the female can be confused with the similarly sized male Eurasian Goshawk, but lacks the bulk of that species. Eurasian sparrowhawks are smaller, more slender and have shorter wings, a square-ended tail and fly with faster wingbeats. A confusion species in China is the besra, although A. n. melaschistos is considerably larger.

In Great Britain, Eurasian sparrowhawks living further north are bigger than their more southerly counterparts, with wing length (the most reliable indicator of body size) increasing by an average of 0.86 mm (0.034 in) in males, and 0.75 mm (0.030 in) in females, for each degree further north.

== Distribution and habitat ==
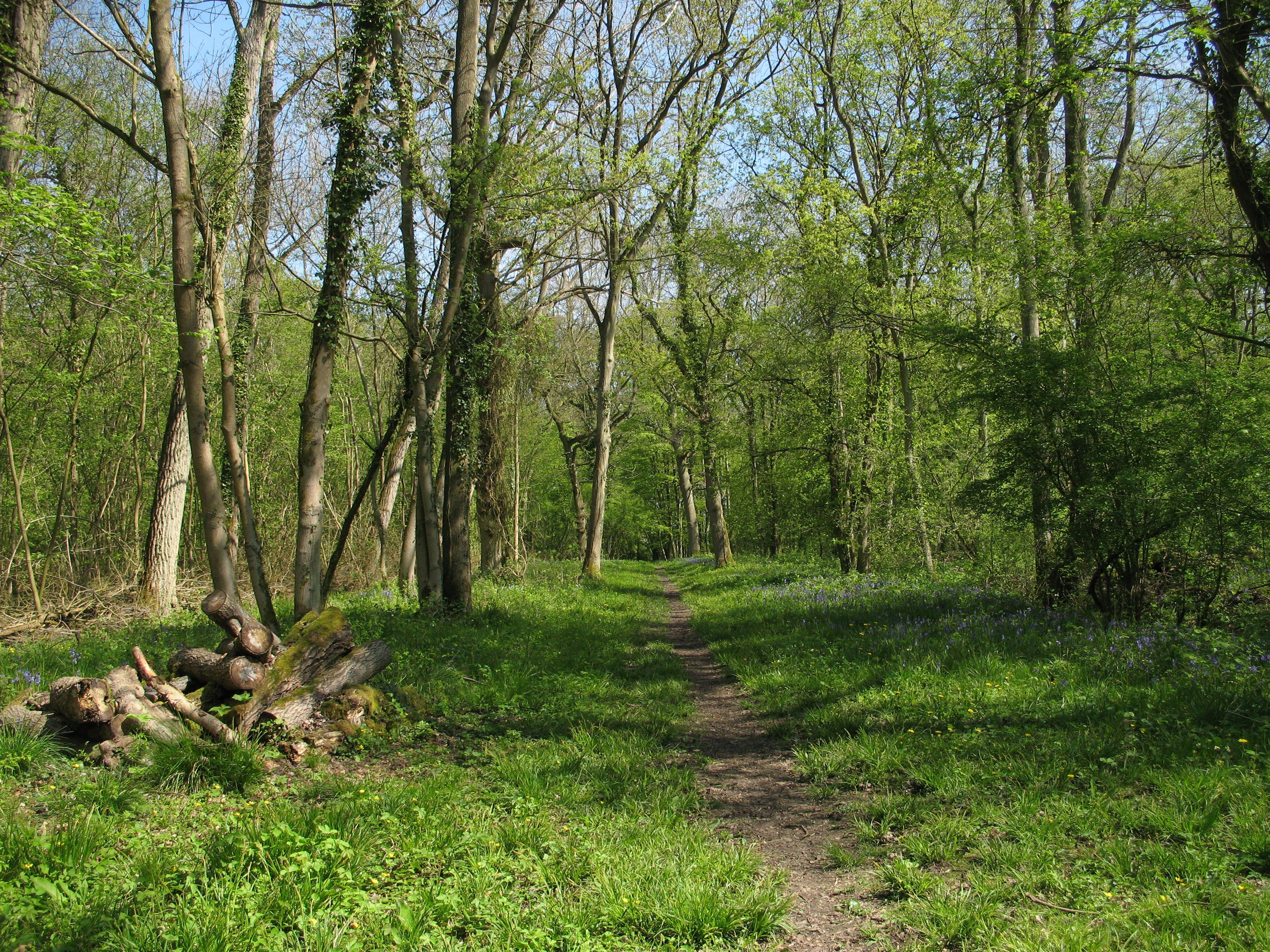
Deciduous woodland is a typical breeding and hunting habitat for the Eurasian sparrowhawk.

A widespread species throughout the temperate and subtropical parts of the Old World, the Eurasian sparrowhawk is resident or breeds in an estimated global range of 23,600,000 km^{2} (9,100,000 sq mi) and had an estimated population of 1.5 million birds in 2009. Although global population trends have not been analysed, numbers seem to be stable, so it has been classified as being of least concern by IUCN. The race granti, with 100 pairs resident on Madeira and 200 pairs on the Canary Islands, is threatened by loss of habitat, egg-collecting and illegal hunting, and is listed on Annex I of the European Commission Birds Directive. It is one of the most common birds of prey in Europe, along with the common kestrel and common buzzard. The Norwegian and Albanian populations are declining and, in many parts of Europe, Eurasian sparrowhawks are still shot. However, this low-level persecution has not affected the populations badly. In the UK, the population increased by 108% between 1970 and 2005, but saw a 1% decline over 1994–2006. In Ireland it is the most common bird of prey, breeding even near the city centre of Dublin, where it frequents parks and large gardens.

This species is prevalent in most woodland types in its range, and also in more open country with scattered trees. Eurasian sparrowhawks prefer to hunt the edges of wooded areas, but migrant birds can be seen in any habitat. The increased proportion of medium-aged stands of trees created by modern forestry techniques have benefited Accipiter nisus, according to a Norwegian study. Unlike its larger relative the Eurasian Goshawk, it can be seen in gardens and in urban areas and will even breed in city parks if they have a certain density of tall trees.

Eurasian sparrowhawks from colder regions of northern Europe and Asia migrate south for the winter, some to north Africa (some as far as equatorial east Africa) and India; members of the southern populations are resident or disperse. Juveniles begin their migration earlier than adults and juvenile females move before juvenile males. Analysis of ringing data collected at Heligoland, Germany, found that males move further and more often than females; of migrating birds ringed at Kaliningrad, Russia, the average distance moved before recovery (when the ring is read and the bird's whereabouts reported subsequently) was 1,328 km (825 mi) for males and 927 km (576 mi) for females.

A study of Eurasian sparrowhawks in southern Scotland found that ringed birds which had been raised on "high grade" territories were recovered in greater proportion than birds which came from "low grade" territories. This suggested that the high grade territories produced young which survived better. The recovery rate also declined with increased elevation of the ground. After the post-fledging period, female birds dispersed greater distances than did males.

== Behaviour and ecology ==
=== Diet and predation ===
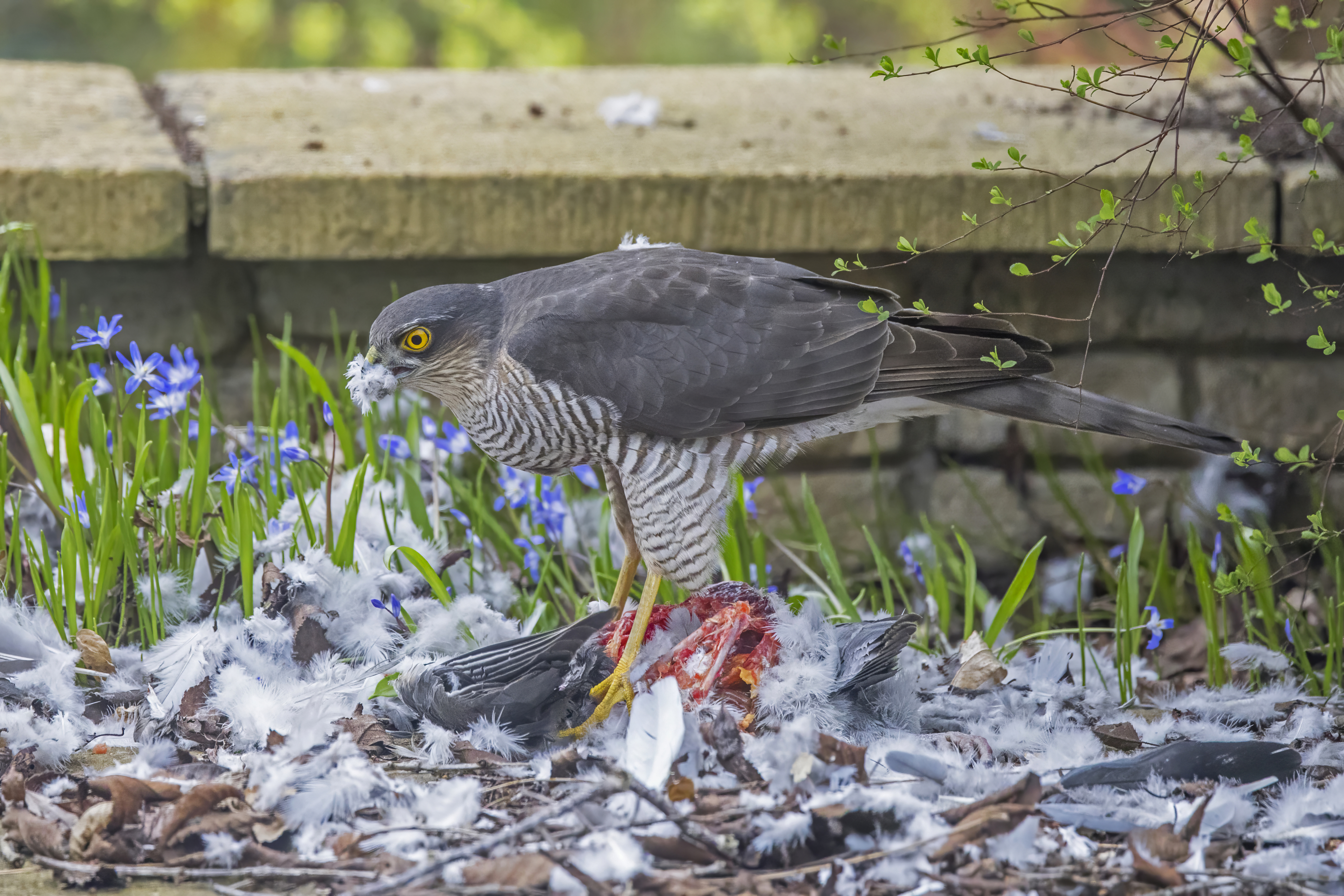
Adult female eating a pigeon

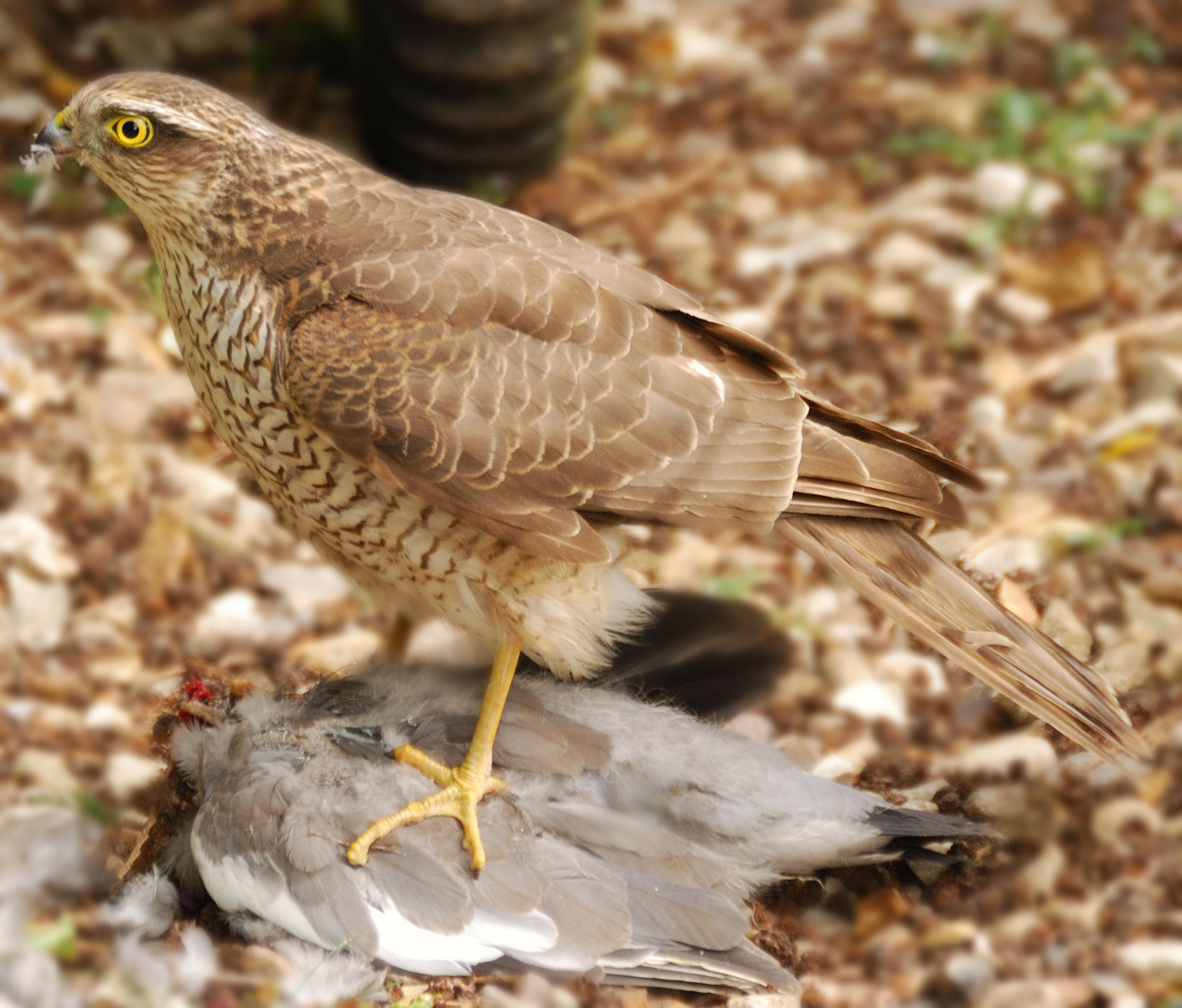
A juvenile with the carcass of a common wood pigeon (Columba palumbus)

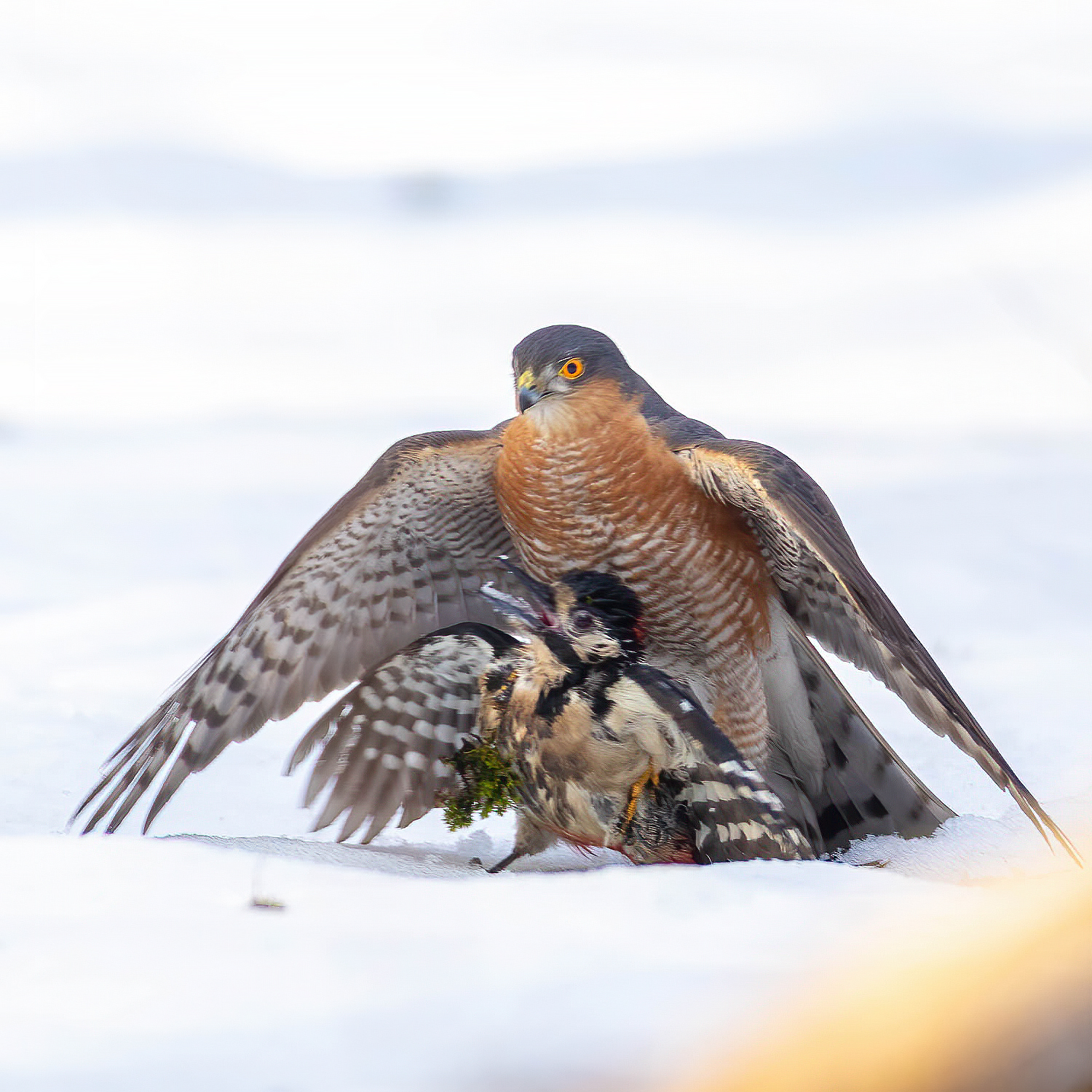
Adult male hunting a great spotted woodpecker, in Moscow

The Eurasian sparrowhawk is a major predator of smaller woodland birds, though only 10% of its hunting attacks are successful. It hunts by surprise attack, using hedges, tree-belts, copses, orchards and other cover near woodland areas; its choice of habitat is dictated by these requirements. It also makes use of gardens in built-up areas, taking advantage of the prey found there.

It waits, hidden, for birds to come near, then breaks cover and flies out fast and low. A chase may follow, with the hawk even flipping upside-down to grab the victim from below or following it on foot through vegetation. It can "stoop" onto prey from a great height. Ian Newton describes seven modes of hunting used by Eurasian sparrowhawks:

- Short-stay-perch-hunting
- High soaring and stooping
- Contour-hugging in flight
- Still-hunting
- Low quartering
- Hunting by sound
- Hunting on foot
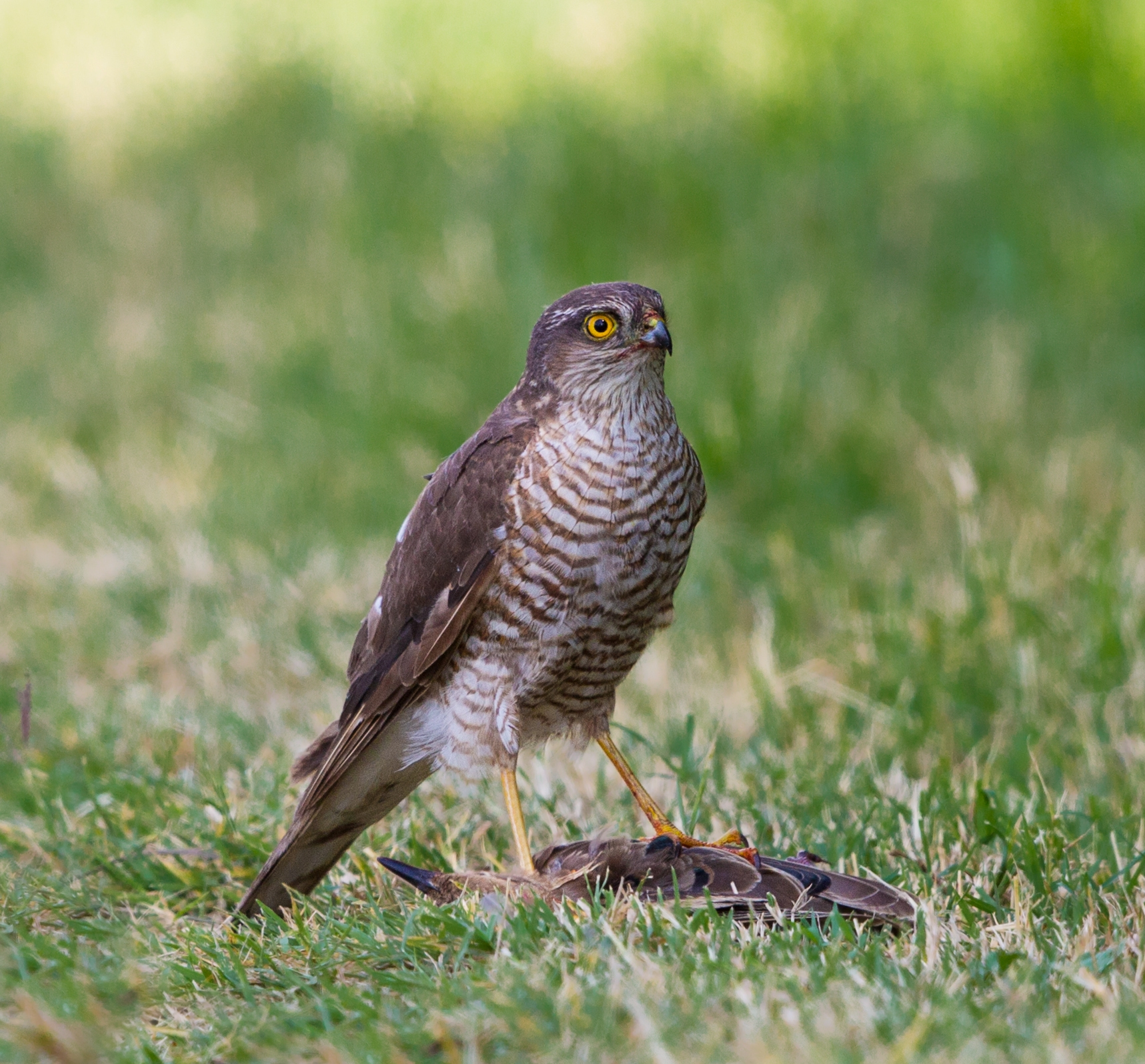
With common starling prey

The sparrowhawk bears numerous adaptations that allow it to fly at speed low to the ground and hunt in confined spaces; these include its blunted wings, which allow it to fly through narrow gaps in hedges and fences, and its long, square-edged tail, which the bird uses to aid itself in carrying out tight turns, such as those required to negotiate close stands of trees.

Male Eurasian sparrowhawks regularly kill birds weighing up to 40 g (1.4 oz) and sometimes up to 120 g (4.2 oz) or more; females can tackle prey up to 500 g (18 oz) or more. A recent study found that on average, female sparrowhawk prey were two and a half times heavier than that of the male. The weight of food consumed by adult birds daily is estimated to be 40–50 g (1.4–1.8 oz) for males and 50–70 g (1.8–2.5 oz) for females. During one year, a pair of Eurasian sparrowhawks could take 2,200 house sparrows, 600 common blackbirds or 110 wood pigeons. Species that feed in the open, far from cover, or are conspicuous by their behaviour or coloration, are taken more often by Eurasian sparrowhawks. For example, great tits and house sparrows are vulnerable to attack. Eurasian sparrowhawks may account for more than 50% of deaths in certain species, but the extent varies from area to area.

Males tend to take tits, finches, sparrows and buntings; females often take thrushes and starlings. More than 120 bird species have been recorded as prey and individual Eurasian sparrowhawks may specialise in certain prey. The birds taken are usually adults or fledglings, though chicks in the nest and carrion are sometimes eaten. Small mammals, including mice, bats, voles, squirrels, shrews, and young rabbits, are sometimes caught but insects are eaten only very rarely.

Small birds are killed on impact or when squeezed by the Eurasian sparrowhawk's foot, especially the two long claws. Larger quarry (such as doves and magpies) may not die immediately but succumb during feather plucking and eating. Victims which struggle are "kneaded" by the hawk, using its talons to squeeze and stab. When dealing with large prey species which peck and flap, the hawk's long legs help in restraining the prey. It stands on top of its prey to pluck and pull it apart. The feathers are plucked and usually the breast muscles are eaten first. The bones are left, but can be broken using the notch in the bill. Like other birds of prey, Eurasian sparrowhawks produce pellets containing indigestible parts of their prey. These range from 25 to 35 mm (0.98 to 1.38 in) long and 10–18 mm (0.39–0.71 in) wide and are round at one end and more narrow and pointed at the other. They are usually composed of small feathers, as the larger ones are plucked and not consumed.

Video of a Eurasian sparrowhawk subduing a pigeon

During hunting, this species can fly 2–3 km (1.2–1.9 mi) per day. It rises above tree level mostly to display, soar above territory and to make longer journeys. A study in a forested area of Norway found that the mean size of the home ranges was 9.2 km^{2} (3.6 sq mi) for males, and 12.3 km^{2} (4.7 sq mi) for females, which was larger than studies in Great Britain had found, "probably due to lower land productivity and associated lower densities of prey species in the [Norwegian study area]".

A study looked at the effect on the population of blue tits in an area where a pair of Eurasian sparrowhawks began to breed in 1990. It found that the annual adult survival rate for the tits in that area dropped from 0.485 to 0.376 (the rate in adjacent plots did not change). The size of the breeding population was not changed, but there were fewer non-breeding blue tits in the population. In woodland, Eurasian sparrowhawks account for the deaths of a third of all young great tits; the two alarm calls given by great tits when mobbing a predator, and when fleeing from a nearby hawk, are within the optimum hearing range of both prey and predator; however, the high-pitched alarm call given when a distant flying Eurasian sparrowhawk is seen "can only be heard well by the tit". In Sussex, the impact of Eurasian sparrowhawk predation on grey partridges was highest when the partridge density was lowest. A 10-year study in Scotland showed that Eurasian sparrowhawks did not select the common redshanks they predated according to the waders' size or condition, probably because of the hawks' surprise-attack hunting technique. In Britain, the increase in population of the Eurasian sparrowhawk coincides with the decline of the house sparrow population.

Another study found that the risk of predation for a bird targeted by a Eurasian sparrowhawk or Eurasian Goshawk increased 25-fold if the prey was infected with the blood parasite Leucocytozoon, and birds with avian malaria were 16 times more likely to be killed.

=== Predators ===
Natural predators of the Eurasian sparrowhawk include the barn owl, the tawny owl, the Eurasian Goshawk, the peregrine falcon, the golden eagle, the bald eagle, the eagle owl, the red fox, the stone marten and the pine marten.

=== Reproduction and breeding ===
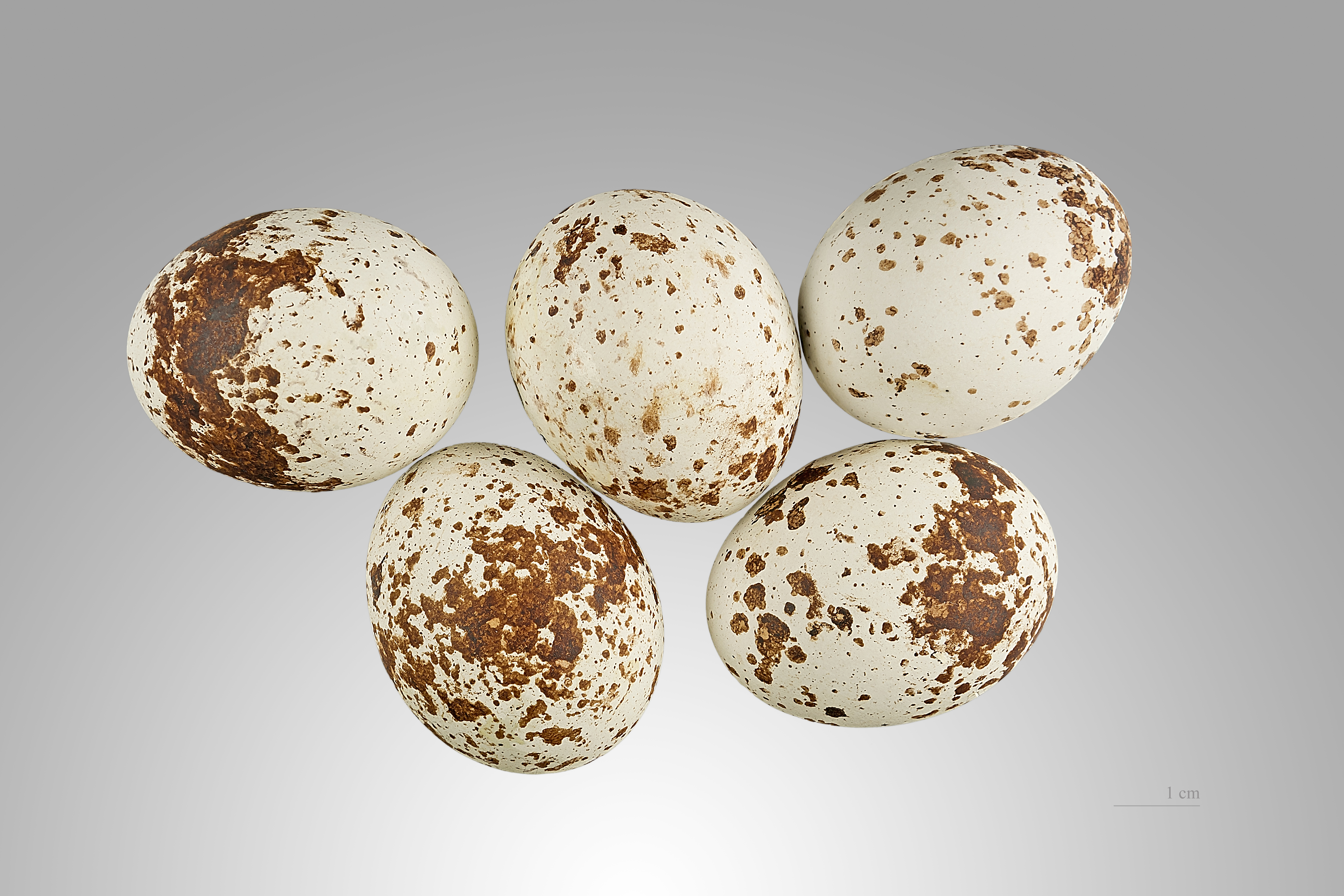
Illustration of an egg. The background colour of the eggs changes from light blue to white on storage in collections

The eggs are pale blue with brown spots and each measure 35–46 mm (1.4–1.8 in) x 28–35 mm (1.1–1.4 in), and weigh about 22.5 g (0.79 oz) of which 8% is shell in a healthy egg. Usually a clutch of four or five eggs is laid. The eggs are generally laid in the morning with an interval of 2–3 days between each egg. If a clutch is lost, up to two further eggs may be laid that are smaller than the earlier eggs.

The altricial, downy chicks hatch after 33 days of incubation. After hatching, the female cares for and feeds the chicks for the first 8–14 days of life, and also during bad weather after that. The male provides food, up to six kills per day in the first week increasing to eight per day in the third and 10 per day in the last week in the nest, by which time the female is also hunting.

By 24–28 days after hatching, the young birds start to perch on branches near the nest and take their first flight. They are fed by their parents for a further 28–30 days, staying close to the nest while growing and practicing flying. At this stage they are extremely vocal, and their cries to their parents can often be heard a considerable distance away. The young hawks disperse after their parents stop provisioning them. Though they receive the same amount of food, male chicks (roughly half the size of females) mature more quickly and seem to be ready to leave the nest sooner. In a study in the Forest of Ae, south-west Scotland, it was found that 21% of nestlings over two days old died, with the causes of death being starvation, wet weather, predation and desertion by the parents. The parasite Leucocytozoon toddi can be passed from parent to nestling at the nest, possibly because of the number of birds sharing a small space, thus allowing transmission.

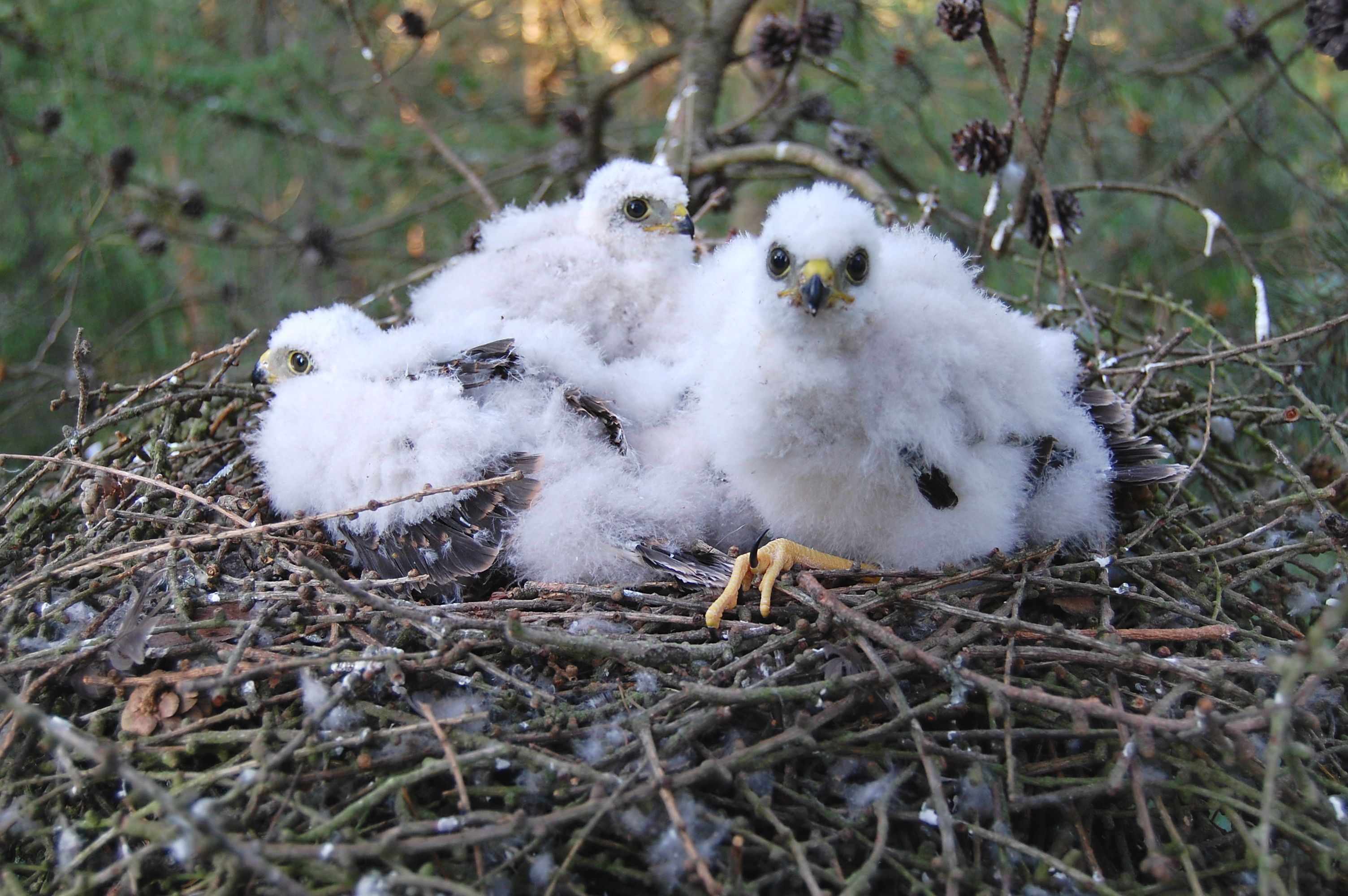
The chicks stay on the nest until they are 24 to 28 days old.

The Eurasian sparrowhawk breeds in well-grown, extensive areas of woodland, often coniferous or mixed, preferring forest with a structure neither too dense nor too open, to allow a choice of flight paths. The nest can be located in the fork of a tree, often near the trunk and where two or three branches begin, on a horizontal branch in the lower canopy, or near the top of a tall shrub. If available, conifers are preferred. A new nest is built every year, generally close to the nest of the previous year, and sometimes using an old wood pigeon (A. n. melaschistos frequently uses the old nests of jungle crows) nest as a base; the male does most of the work. The structure, made of loose twigs up to 60 cm (2.0 ft) long, has an average diameter of 60 cm (24 in). When the eggs are laid, a lining of fine twigs or bark chippings is added.

During the breeding season, the adult male Eurasian sparrowhawk loses a small amount of weight while feeding his mate before she lays eggs, and also when the young are large and require more food. The weight of the adult female is highest in May, when laying eggs, and lowest in August after the breeding cycle is complete. A study suggested that the number of eggs and subsequent breeding success are dependent on the female maintaining a high weight while the male is feeding her.

Sexual maturity is reached at between 1–3 years. Most Eurasian sparrowhawks stay on the same territory for one breeding season, though others keep the same one for up to eight years. A change of mate usually triggers the change in territory. Older birds tend to stay in the same territory; failed breeding attempts make a move more likely. The birds which kept the same territories had higher nest success, though it did not increase between years; females which moved experienced more success the year after changing territory.

=== Lifespan and demography ===
The oldest known wild Eurasian sparrowhawk lived more than two decades; it was found dead in Denmark 20 years and 3 months after having been ringed. The typical lifespan is four years. Data analysis by the British Trust for Ornithology shows that the proportion of juveniles surviving their first year of life is 34%; adult survival from one year to the next is 69%. Birds in their first year of life weigh less than adults, and are especially light in the first two months after reaching independence. There is probably high mortality, especially for young males, during this time. A study in southern Scotland suggested that the greater mortality in young male birds may be due to their smaller size and the smaller size of their prey, which means that they can "last less long between meals". Their size also means that their range of prey is restricted. It has been estimated that a female Eurasian sparrowhawk of average weight could survive for seven days without feeding – three days longer than a male of average weight.

A study of female Eurasian sparrowhawks found "strong evidence" that their rate of survival increased for the first three years of life, and declined for the last five to six years. Senescence (ageing) was the cause of the decline as the birds became older.

== Threats ==
=== Pollutants ===
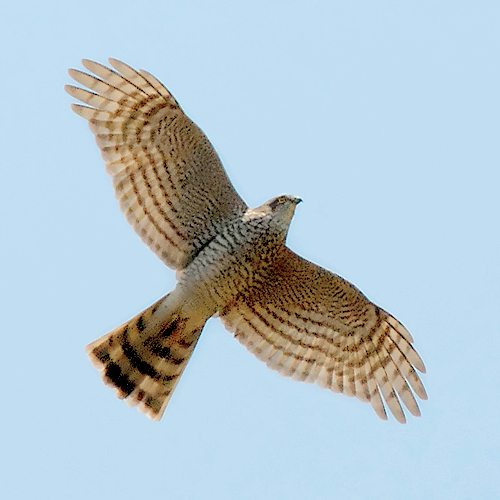
In flight as seen from below, showing barring on underparts.

The Eurasian sparrowhawk population in Europe crashed in the second half of the 20th century. The decline coincided with the introduction of cyclodiene insecticides – aldrin, dieldrin and heptachlor – used as seed dressings in agriculture in 1956. The chemicals accumulated in the bodies of grain-eating birds and had two effects on top predators like the Eurasian sparrowhawk and peregrine falcon: the shells of eggs they laid were too thin, causing them to break during incubation; and birds were poisoned by lethal concentrations of the insecticides. Sub-lethal effects of these substances include irritability, convulsions and disorientation. In west Germany, around 80% of nests before the 1950s produced young, but only 54% were successful in the 1960s and '70s.

In the United Kingdom, the species almost became extinct in East Anglia, where the chemicals were most widely used; in western and northern parts of the country, where the pesticides were not used, there were no declines. The Royal Society for the Protection of Birds bought its Coombes Valley nature reserve in Staffordshire because it was the only Eurasian sparrowhawk breeding site left in the English Midlands.

In the UK, the use of cyclodienes as seed dressings for autumn-sown cereals was banned in 1975 and the levels of the chemicals present in the bird population began to fall. The population has largely recovered to pre-decline levels, with an increase seen in many areas, for example northern Europe. In Sweden, the population also decreased drastically from the 1950s, but recovered again once organochlorines were banned in the 1970s.

In the UK, the failure rate at the egg stage had decreased from 17% to 6% by the year 2000, and the population had stabilised after reaching a peak in the 1990s. A study of the eggs of Dutch Eurasian sparrowhawks found that contamination with Dichlorodiphenyldichloroethylene (DDE) – a "very persistent compound" produced when DDT breaks down – continued into the 1980s, though a decline in the number of clutches with broken eggs during the 1970s suggested decreasing levels of the chemical.

Body tissue samples from Eurasian sparrowhawks are still analysed as part of the Predatory Bird Monitoring Scheme conducted by the UK government's Joint Nature Conservation Committee. Although the average liver concentrations of polychlorinated biphenyls (PCBs) in Eurasian sparrowhawks were lower in birds that died in 2005 compared to those that died in 2004, there was not a significant or consistent decline in residues between 2000 and 2005.

=== Conflict with humans ===
The Eurasian sparrowhawk's adaptation for feeding on birds has brought it into conflict with humans; in the 19th century it was described as "the great enemy of small quadrupeds and birds, and often very destructive to young chicks in poultry-yards in the breeding season" and "very destructive to partridges". Writing for gamekeepers in 1851, T. B. Johnson recommended that: "The nest of this bird should be diligently sought ... and destroyed, shooting the parent birds first, if possible."

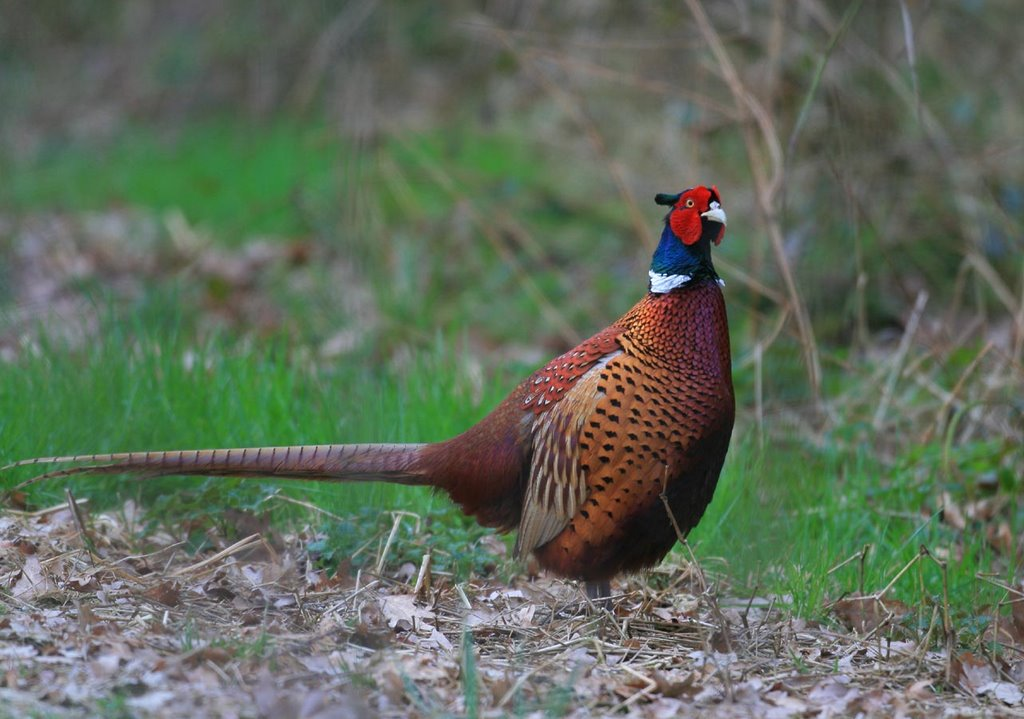
The Eurasian sparrowhawk's natural hunting behaviour can conflict with gamekeepers rearing common pheasants.

It was written in 1870 that "The sparrowhawk is perhaps only the true enemy of the game-preserver; though at the same time it is probable that if the good and evil it does were justly weighed, the balance would be in favour of the hawk, its favourite quarry being the wood pigeon, which is now increasing to an extent injurious to agriculture." Parish records of the 18th century for Aldworth, Berkshire, in southern England, show that payments were made for 106 Eurasian sparrowhawks' heads, at the same time as efforts were being made to control the numbers of sparrows.

The species suffered heavy persecution by 18th-century European landowners and gamekeepers, but withstood attempts to eradicate it. For example, on the estate at Sandringham in Norfolk, 1,645 'hawks' were killed between 1938 and 1950, with 1,115 taken between 1919 and 1926 at Langwell and Sandside in Caithness, Scotland.

The population was able to quickly replace lost birds – there is a high proportion of non-breeding, non-territorial birds able to fill vacant territories. The habitat conserved with gamebirds in mind also suited this species and its prey; gamekeepers' more successful efforts to wipe out the Eurasian Goshawk and pine marten – predators of the Eurasian sparrowhawk – may have benefited it. The population increased markedly when this pressure was relaxed, for example during the First and Second World Wars.

In the United Kingdom, research into the effect of predators on bird populations has been "a contentious issue", with "perceived conflict between the interests of nature conservationists and those involved in game shooting". Declines in the populations of some British songbirds since the 1960s have coincided with considerable changes in agricultural practices and also large increases in the numbers of Eurasian sparrowhawks and European magpies. When the Eurasian sparrowhawk population declined because of organochlorine use, there was no great increase in the populations of songbirds. In a 1949–1979 study of 13 passerine species breeding in a 40-acre (16-hectare) oakwood at Bookham Commons, Surrey, England, none was present in significantly greater numbers when Eurasian sparrowhawks were absent from the wood.

Many studies, mostly short-term, failed to find an effect on songbird populations caused by predatory birds such as Eurasian sparrowhawks. But analysis of long-term, large-scale national data from the UK's Common Bird Census demonstrated that the declines in farmland songbird populations since the 1960s are unlikely to have been caused by increased predation by Eurasian sparrowhawks and magpies. The results of the study indicated that patterns of year-to-year songbird population change were the same at different sites, whether the predators were present or not. Another study, which examined the effects of predators – including the Eurasian sparrowhawk and introduced grey squirrel – on UK passerine populations, found that "whilst a small number of associations may suggest significant negative effects between predator and prey species, for the majority of the songbird species examined there is no evidence that increases in common avian predators or grey squirrels are associated with large-scale population declines."

Racing pigeon owners in Great Britain have said for many years that Eurasian sparrowhawks and peregrine falcons "cause serious and escalating losses" of pigeons and some have called for these birds of prey to be killed or removed from areas surrounding homing pigeon lofts.

In Scotland, a two-year study published in 2004, and funded by Scottish Natural Heritage and the Scottish Homing Union (SHU), found there was "no evidence that birds of prey cause major losses of racing pigeons at lofts or during races." It reported that 56% of racing pigeons were lost each year but that the proportion taken by Eurasian sparrowhawks – "often blamed for major losses" – was less than 1%, with at least 2% taken by peregrine falcons. The study was carried out by the Central Science Laboratory; researchers worked with SHU members who provided data, information on pigeon rings found at peregrine falcon nests and pigeon carcasses.

From January to April 2009, the Scottish Government conducted a trial translocation of Eurasian sparrowhawks from around racing pigeon lofts in Glasgow, Edinburgh, Kilmarnock, Stirling and Dumfries. The trial, which cost £25,000, was supported by the Scottish Homing Union, representing the country's 3,500 pigeon fanciers. The experiment was originally scheduled for early in 2008 but was postponed because it would have impinged on the birds' breeding season. It was criticised by the government's own ecological adviser, Dr Ian Bainbridge, the government body Scottish Natural Heritage and organisations including the Royal Society for the Protection of Birds and the Scottish Society for Prevention of Cruelty to Animals.

The findings, released in January 2010, showed that only seven Eurasian sparrowhawks had been removed from the area from five pigeon lofts. One hawk returned twice to the area of the loft, while new birds began to visit two other lofts. The report found that "The quantity and quality of the observational data collected meant that it was impossible to draw any firm conclusions" and the government stated that "no further research involving the trapping or translocation of raptors" would take place, while the SHU maintained that it was "very optimistic that licensed trapping and translocation could at last provide some protection."

Eurasian sparrowhawks are an effective urban adapter species in the UK and are thus non-threatened, however, recent search has suggested that they are prone to colliding with man-made structures such as buildings when hunting.

=== Falconry ===
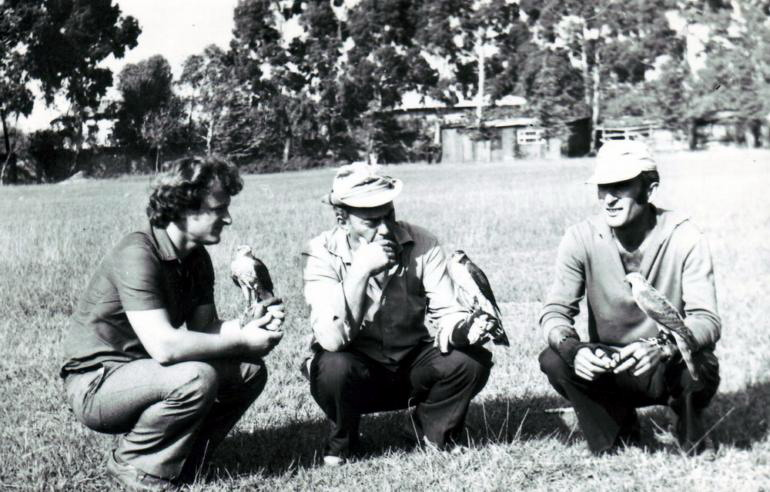
The Eurasian sparrowhawk is popular with falconers in Georgia.

The Eurasian sparrowhawk has been used in falconry for centuries and was favoured by Emperor Akbar the Great (1542–1605) of the Mughal Empire. There is a tradition of using migrant Eurasian sparrowhawks to catch common quail in Tunisia and Georgia, where there are 500 registered bazieri (sparrowhawkers) and a monument to bazieri in the city of Poti. Eurasian sparrowhawks are also popular in Ireland. At Cap Bon in Tunisia, and in Turkey, thousands are captured each year by falconers and used for hunting migrant common quails. Although they were formerly released at the end of the season, many are now kept because of the scarcity of migrants.

In 17th century England, the Eurasian sparrowhawk was used by priests, reflecting their lowly status; whereas in the Middle Ages, they were favoured by ladies of noble and royal status because of their small size. The falconer's name for a male Eurasian sparrowhawk is a "musket"; this is derived from the Latin word musca, meaning 'a fly', via the Old French word moschet.

"An austringer [falconer] undertaking to train a sparrowhawk should be in no doubt that he is taking on one of the most difficult hawks available." A female Eurasian sparrowhawk is considered a bad choice for a novice and the male is very difficult and demanding, even for an experienced handler. They have been described as "hysterical little hawks" but are also praised as courageous and providing "sport of the highest quality". Philip Glasier describes Eurasian sparrowhawks as "in many ways superior to hunting with a larger short-wing [hawk]" and "extremely hard to tame". They are best suited for small quarry such as common starlings and common blackbirds but are also capable of taking common teal, Eurasian magpies, pheasants and partridges. A 19th century author remarked that this species was "the best of all hawks for landrails", now known as corn crakes. In 1735, the Sportsman's Dictionary noted that "... she will serve in the winter as well as in the summer, and will fly at all kind of game more than the falcon. If a winter sparrowhawk prove good, she will kill the pye, the chough, the jay, woodcock, thrush, black-bird, fieldfare, and divers[e] other birds of the like nature."

== In culture ==
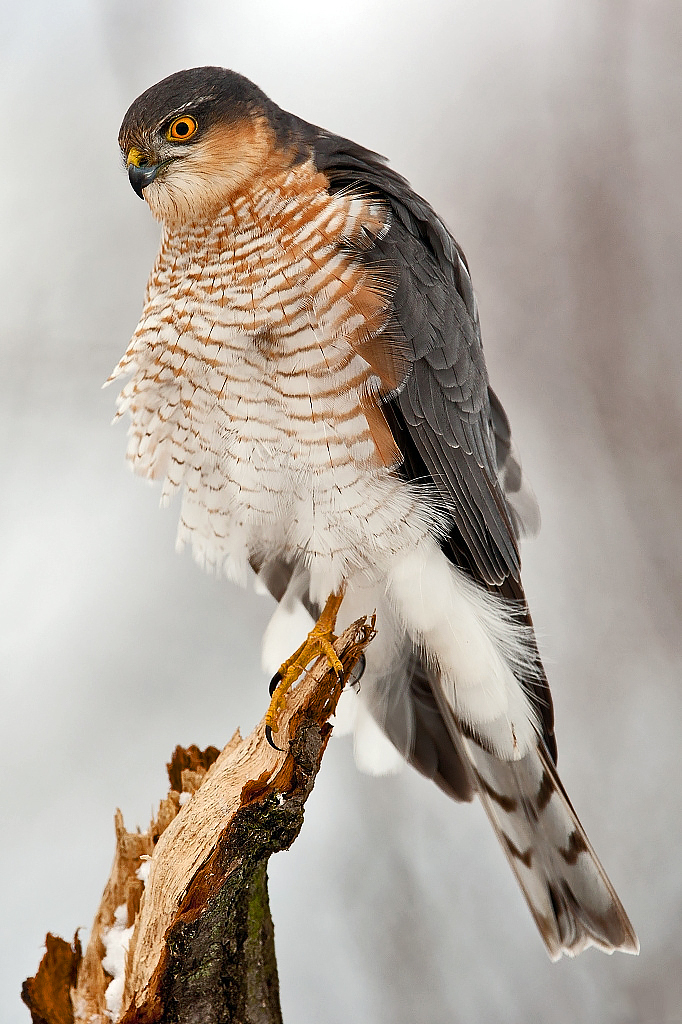
An adult male in Slovakia

In Slavic mythology, the sparrowhawk, known as krahui or krahug, is a sacred bird in Old Bohemian songs and lives in a grove of the gods. Holy sparrowhawks perch on the branches of an oak tree that grows from the grave of a murdered man, and "publish the foul deed". The South Slavic name for this bird, kobac or skobec, comes from Proto-Slavic kob (doom), indicating that omens were read from its flight. It also features in Teutonic mythology. In some areas of England, it was believed that the common cuckoo turned into a Eurasian sparrowhawk in winter. The surname Spearhafoc, later Sparhawk, Sparrowhawk was in use as a personal name in England before the Norman Conquest of England in 1066.

In 1695, John Aubrey wrote in his Miscellanies:

Not long before the Death of King Charles II a sparrow-hawk escaped from the Perch, and pitched on one of the Iron Crowns of the White Tower, and entangling its string in the Crown, hung by the heels and died. T'was considered very ominous, and so it proved.

The musket, or musquet, originally a kind of crossbow bolt, and later a small cannon, was named after the male Eurasian sparrowhawk because of its size. The British Gloster Aircraft Company named one of their Mars series craft the Sparrowhawk.

In William Shakespeare's The Merry Wives of Windsor, Mrs Ford greets Robin, Falstaff's page, with the words "How now, my eyas musket", eyas musket meaning a lively young man (an eyas is a hawk nestling). The British Poet Laureate Ted Hughes wrote a poem entitled "A Sparrow-Hawk" which refers to this species. Hermann Hesse mentioned this bird in his book Demian and the bird is also referred to in One Thousand and One Nights by Richard Francis Burton:

Good sooth my bones, wheneas they hear thy name
Quail as birds quailed when Nisus o'er them flew

The Eurasian sparrowhawk was written about by Alfred, Lord Tennyson:

A sparhawk proud did hold in wicked jail

Music's sweet chorister, the Nightingale
To whom with sighs she said: 'O set me free,
And in my song I'll praise no bird but thee.'
The Hawk replied: 'I will not lose my diet

To let a thousand such enjoy their quiet.'

It also appears in Tennyson's Idylls of the King.
