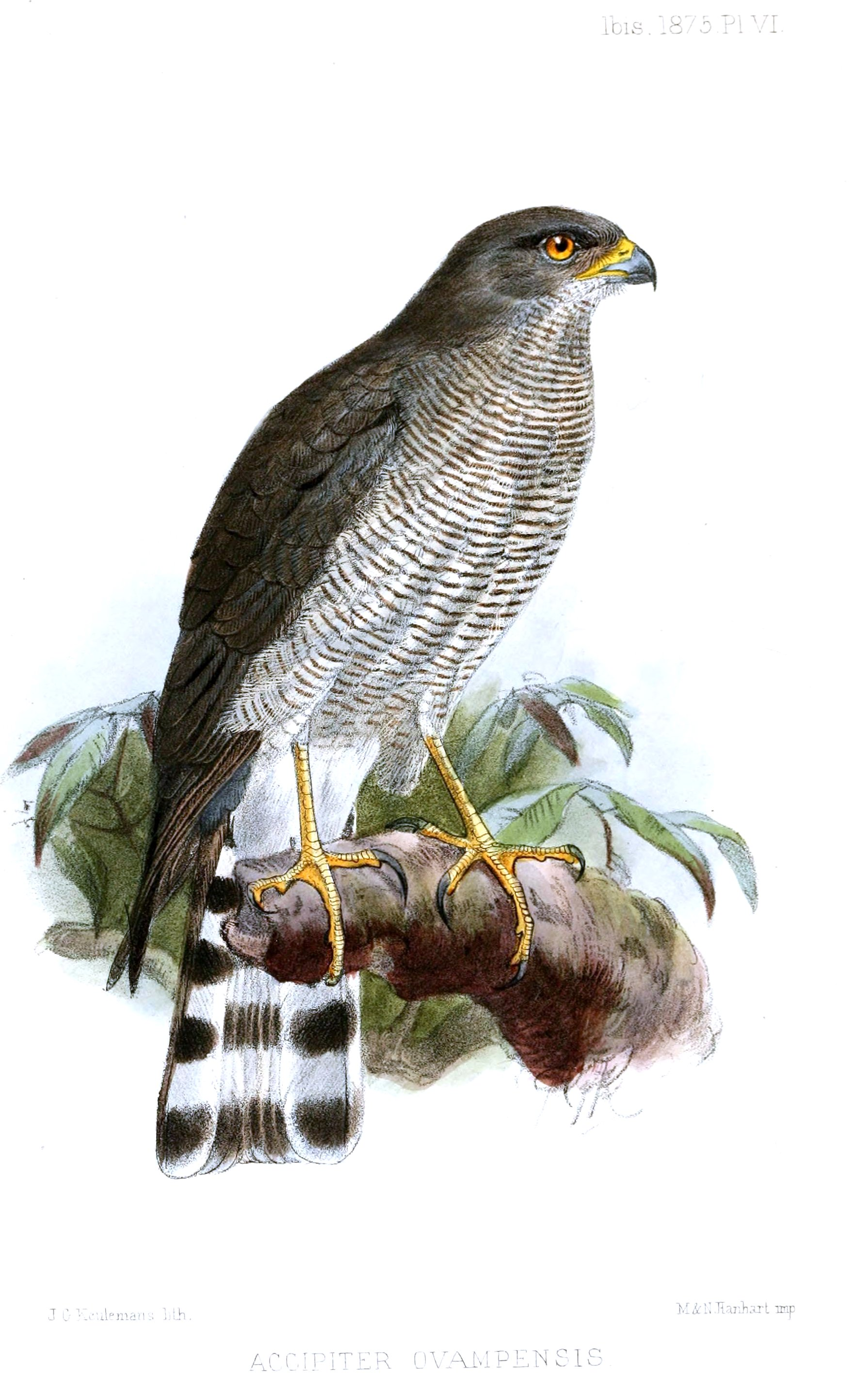

Conservation status
- Least Concern (IUCN 3.1)

Scientific classification
- Kingdom: Animalia
- Phylum: Chordata
- Class: Aves
- Order: Accipitriformes
- Family: Accipitridae
- Genus: Accipiter
- Species: A. ovampensis

Binomial name
- Accipiter ovampensis Gurney, JH Sr, 1875

Synonyms
- Accipiter hilgerti Erlanger 1904

= Ovambo sparrowhawk =

Species of bird

The Ovambo or Ovampo sparrowhawk, also known as Hilgert's sparrowhawk, (Accipiter ovampensis) is a species of sub-Saharan African bird of prey in the family Accipitridae. It takes its name from the Ovamboland in northern Namibia.

== Description ==
The Ovambo sparrowhawk is a small sparrowhawk with the typical broad winged, long-tailed shape of a member of the genus Accipiter. The adults have plain grey upperparts with white bars on the rump and white underparts which are finely barred with grey but with a plain white vent. The tail has three dark bars and a broad, dark subterminal band. The bill is black, contrasting with the red cere, the eyes are dark red and the legs are orange. There is a melanistic form which is all black except for the white barred flight feathers on the underwing. The juvenile is browner and may be white over the underparts and head or have a brown head and rufous underparts. Females are about 14% bigger than males, weighing in at 180–305 g (6.3–10.8 oz) to the males 105–190 g (3.7–6.7 oz). The total length is about 30 cm (12 in) and the wingspan is 67 cm (26 in).

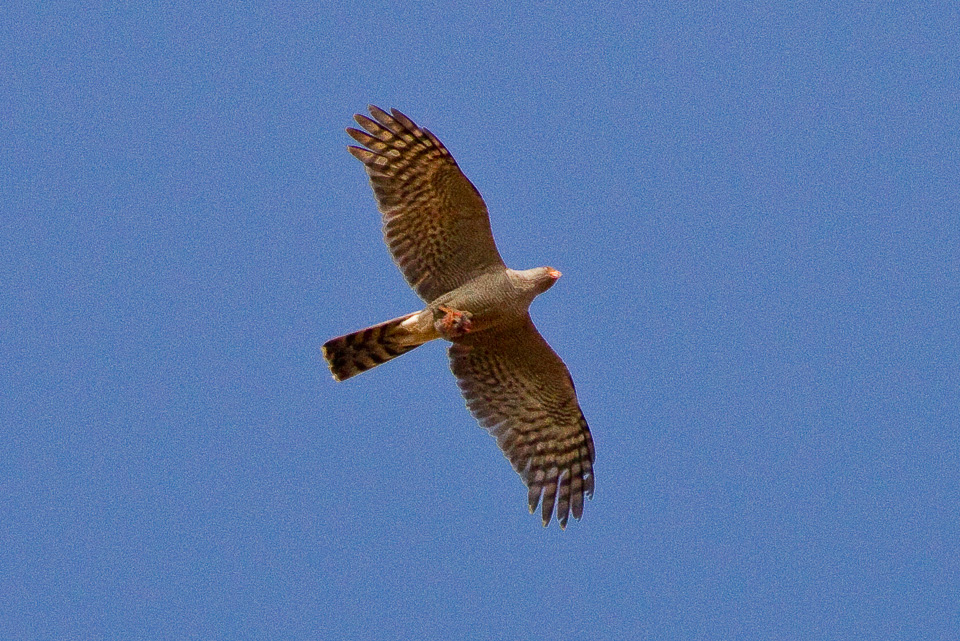
In flight

== Distribution and movements ==
It occurs in sub-Saharan Africa and breeds mostly south of the equator. It is a localised and uncommon breeder in east Africa north as far as Ethiopia and Eritrea south to Tanzania. The main range is in southern Africa where it extends from the southern Democratic Republic of Congo to northern Namibia, Botswana, northern South Africa, Eswatini and Mozambique. In western Africa it is found from the Central African Republic in the east to the Ivory Coast in the west. Birds seen in the northern parts of the range, especially in west Africa, are probably nomadic non-breeding visitors.

== Habitat ==
The Ovambo sparrowhawk generally favours the edges of drier forest, woodland and exotic plantations, moving into surrounding savanna and tall woodland with patches of open ground, such as riverine and broad-leaved woodland. In southern Africa its habitat is usually dominated by miombo (Brachystegia spp), Mahobohobo (Uapaca kirkiana) or Zambezi teak (Baikiaea plurijuga).

== Habits ==
The Ovambo sparrowhawk is almost exclusively a hunter of birds mostly up to 60 g (2.1 oz) in weight but females will attack larger birds such as doves up to 250 g (8.8 oz), it has even been recorded catching a budgerigar. Its hunting technique is more like that of a falcon rather than a typical sparrowhawk, hunting by soaring at a relatively high height and stooping on any prey spotted, the chasing it for 100–200 m (330–660 ft). However, it often perches quietly within the canopy, when not hunting.

The Ovambo sparrowhawk is territorial and the female does most of the nest-building, creating a platform of sticks lined with bark chips and occasionally green leaves. It is typically placed in the canopy of a tree, either a native tree or an alien tree such as eucalyptus. The eggs are laid in August to November, peaking in August and September and the clutch is between one and five eggs. The female incubates the eggs, while the male brings her food, usually 2-3 times a day. The male continues to be the sole provider of food for both the female and the chicks for 18 days after hatching, after which the female starts to hunt too. The young fledge after 33–39 days and become fully independent about a month after that.

== Taxonomy ==
The Ovambo sparrowhawk is apparently closely related to the Madagascar sparrowhawk Accipiter madagascarensis and phylogenetic analysis supports these two species forming a well defined clade.
