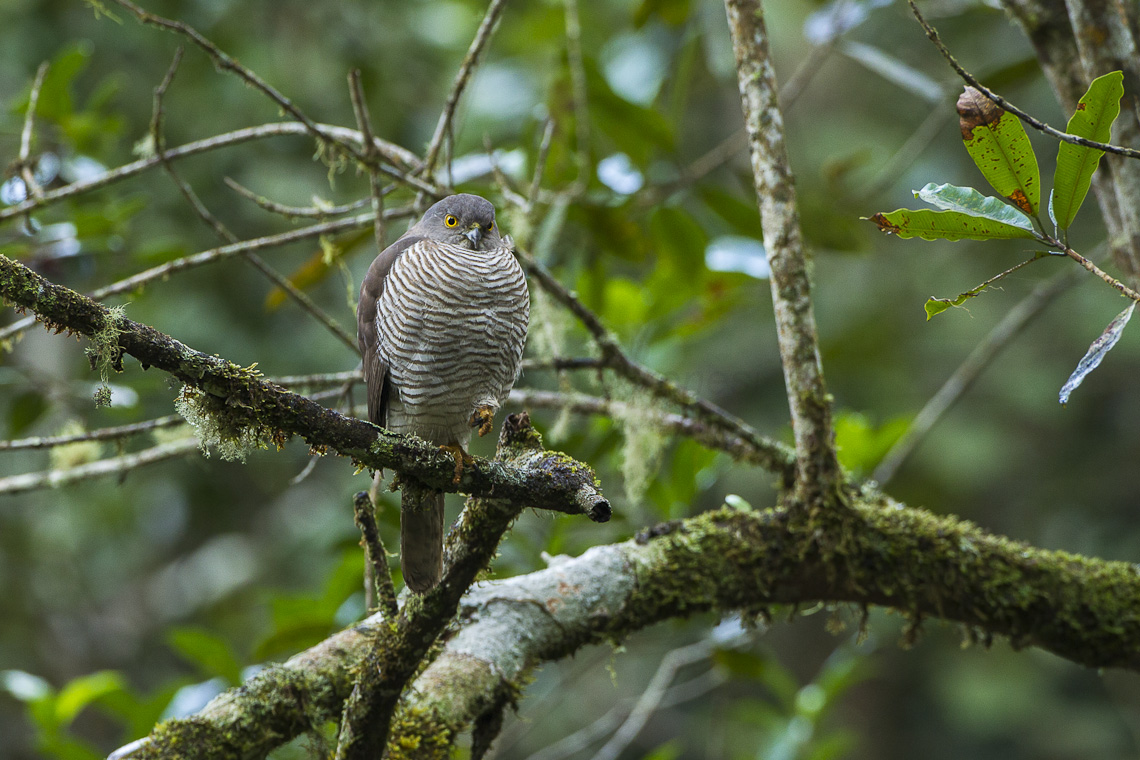

Conservation status
- Near Threatened (IUCN 3.1)

Scientific classification
- Kingdom: Animalia
- Phylum: Chordata
- Class: Aves
- Order: Accipitriformes
- Family: Accipitridae
- Genus: Accipiter
- Species: A. madagascariensis

Binomial name
- Accipiter madagascariensis Verreaux, J, 1833

= Madagascar sparrowhawk =

Species of bird

The Madagascar sparrowhawk (Accipiter madagascariensis) is a species of bird of prey in the family Accipitridae.

It is endemic to Madagascar. Its natural habitats are subtropical or tropical dry forest, subtropical or tropical moist lowland forest, subtropical or tropical moist montane forest, dry savanna, and subtropical or tropical dry shrubland.

It is threatened by habitat loss.

It may form a superspecies with Eurasian sparrowhawk (A. nisus) and rufous-chested sparrowhawk (A. rufiventris) (Ferguson-Lees and Christie 2001).

== Population and Habitat ==
The Madagascar Sparrowhawk inhabits Madagascar and the Comoro Islands. These Islands are almost 300 miles away from Madagascar over open ocean.

It is suspected that there is between 3300 and 6700 mature Madagascar Sparrowhawks in the wild. It was classified as near threatened in August 2018 by the IUCN.

They can be found at altitudes from sea level up to 1500 meters, but typically stay under 1000 meters. Their habitats consist of rainforests in the East, deciduous forests in the west, and spiny forests in the southwest.

== Diet and Foraging ==
The Madagascar Sparrowhawk eats other small birds which makes up 97% of their prey. Common avian prey includes the Madagascar Black Bulbul, the Madagascar Partridge, and the Madagascar Turtle-Dove. Other prey includes insects, frogs and some reptiles. The Madagascar Sparrow Hawk hunts by concealing themselves in low perches in the forest and pursuing prey in flight.

== Reproduction and Development ==
The female Madagascar Sparrowhawk typically lays three eggs each breeding season in the months of October and November. Eggs are incubated by the female for a period of around 35 days. Nests are sometimes reused over several seasons.

After the eggs hatch the young develop quickly. They will develop to leave the nest at an average of 37 days and become independent of their parents at around 60–67 days. Their life spans can range to 7 years, and they aren't migratory birds.

== Subspecies and description ==
The Comoro Islands have/had 3 distinct subspecies of the Madagascar Sparrowhawk: The Anjouan sparrowhawk, the Mayotte sparrowhawk, and the Sensu Palmer Sparrowhawk. The most notable difference between the Madagascar Sparrowhawks and its distinct subspecies is the difference in color patterns between males and females.

Male Madagascar Sparrowhawks have blue/grey stomachs, wings, and backsides with slight hints of orange around their chest, while females have brown/black chests and wings. But the male and female subspecies Madagascar Sparrowhawks have unusual patterns, that unmistakably make them different.

Males average 158 grams in weight, and females average 206 grams. Length ranges from 43 to 53 cm and wingspan from 86 to 105 cm.

The Sensu Palmer Sparrowhawk has been declared extinct since 1972.

== Threats ==
The Madagascar Sparrowhawk is threatened by habitat loss as a result of logging and wood harvesting. The number of Madagascar Sparrowhawks is decreasing as of 2023.
