= List of Accipitriformes species =

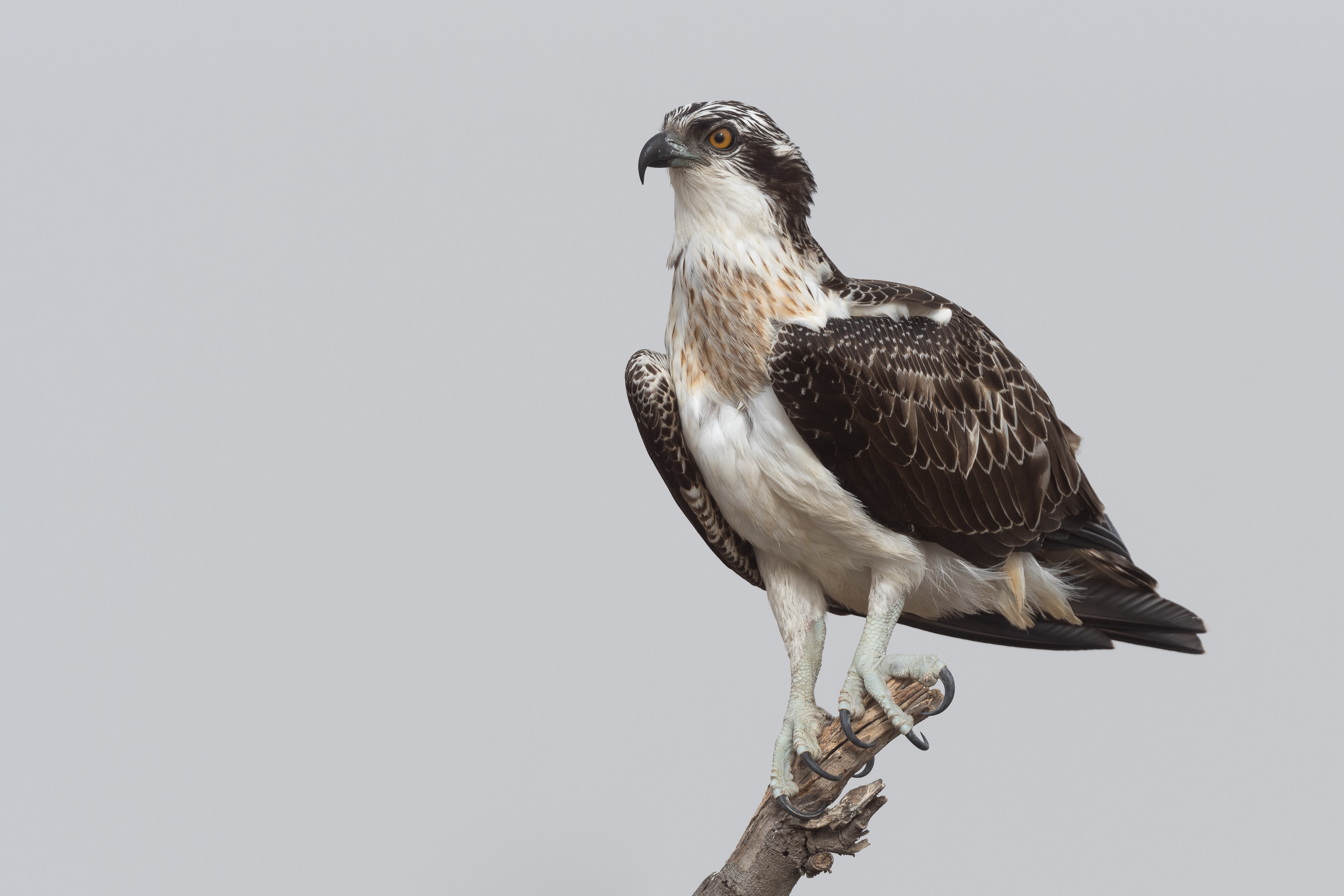
Osprey

Accipitriformes is one of three major orders of birds of prey and includes the osprey, hawks, eagles, kites, and vultures. Falcons (Falconiformes) and owls (Strigiformes) are the other two major orders and are listed in other articles. The International Ornithological Committee (IOC) recognizes these 264 species of Accipitriformes distributed among four families. Among them is the family Cathartidae (New World vultures) that as of early 2025 the American Ornithological Society (AOS), the Clements taxonomy, and BirdLife International's Handbook of the Birds of the World place in its own order, Cathartiformes. The list also includes the Bermuda hawk, Bermuteo avivorus, which has been extinct since the early 17th century.

This list is presented according to the IOC taxonomic sequence and can also be sorted alphabetically by common name, family, and binomial.

== List ==
Common name	Family	Binomial name + authority	IOC sequence
California condor	Cathartidae	Gymnogyps californianus (Shaw, 1797)	1
King vulture	Cathartidae	Sarcoramphus papa (Linnaeus, 1758)	2
Andean condor	Cathartidae	Vultur gryphus Linnaeus, 1758	3
Black vulture	Cathartidae	Coragyps atratus (Bechstein, 1793)	4
Turkey vulture	Cathartidae	Cathartes aura (Linnaeus, 1758)	5
Lesser yellow-headed vulture	Cathartidae	Cathartes burrovianus Cassin, 1845	6
Greater yellow-headed vulture	Cathartidae	Cathartes melambrotus Wetmore, 1964	7
Secretarybird	Sagittariidae	Sagittarius serpentarius (Miller, JF, 1779)	8
Osprey	Pandionidae	Pandion haliaetus (Linnaeus, 1758)	9
Pearl kite	Accipitridae	Gampsonyx swainsonii Vigors, 1825	10
Scissor-tailed kite	Accipitridae	Chelictinia riocourii (Temminck, 1821)	11
White-tailed kite	Accipitridae	Elanus leucurus (Vieillot, 1818)	12
Black-winged kite	Accipitridae	Elanus caeruleus (Desfontaines, 1789)	13
Black-shouldered kite	Accipitridae	Elanus axillaris (Latham, 1801)	14
Letter-winged kite	Accipitridae	Elanus scriptus Gould, 1842	15
African harrier-hawk	Accipitridae	Polyboroides typus Smith, A, 1829	16
Madagascar harrier-hawk	Accipitridae	Polyboroides radiatus (Scopoli, 1786)	17
Palm-nut vulture	Accipitridae	Gypohierax angolensis (Gmelin, JF, 1788)	18
Bearded vulture	Accipitridae	Gypaetus barbatus (Linnaeus, 1758)	19
Egyptian vulture	Accipitridae	Neophron percnopterus (Linnaeus, 1758)	20
Madagascar serpent eagle	Accipitridae	Eutriorchis astur Sharpe, 1875	21
Hook-billed kite	Accipitridae	Chondrohierax uncinatus (Temminck, 1822)	22
Cuban kite	Accipitridae	Chondrohierax wilsonii (Cassin, 1847)	23
Grey-headed kite	Accipitridae	Leptodon cayanensis (Latham, 1790)	24
White-collared kite	Accipitridae	Leptodon forbesi (Swann, 1922)	25
African cuckoo-hawk	Accipitridae	Aviceda cuculoides Swainson, 1837	26
Madagascar cuckoo-hawk	Accipitridae	Aviceda madagascariensis (Smith, A, 1834)	27
Jerdon's baza	Accipitridae	Aviceda jerdoni (Blyth, 1842)	28
Pacific baza	Accipitridae	Aviceda subcristata (Gould, 1838)	29
Black baza	Accipitridae	Aviceda leuphotes (Dumont, 1820)	30
European honey buzzard	Accipitridae	Pernis apivorus (Linnaeus, 1758)	31
Crested honey buzzard	Accipitridae	Pernis ptilorhynchus (Temminck, 1821)	32
Barred honey buzzard	Accipitridae	Pernis celebensis Wallace, 1868	33
Philippine honey buzzard	Accipitridae	Pernis steerei Sclater, WL, 1919	34
Swallow-tailed kite	Accipitridae	Elanoides forficatus (Linnaeus, 1758)	35
Black-breasted buzzard	Accipitridae	Hamirostra melanosternon (Gould, 1841)	36
Square-tailed kite	Accipitridae	Lophoictinia isura (Gould, 1838)	37
Long-tailed honey buzzard	Accipitridae	Henicopernis longicauda (Lesson, RP & Garnot, 1828)	38
Black honey buzzard	Accipitridae	Henicopernis infuscatus Gurney, JH Sr, 1882	39
Red-headed vulture	Accipitridae	Sarcogyps calvus (Scopoli, 1786)	40
White-headed vulture	Accipitridae	Trigonoceps occipitalis (Burchell, 1824)	41
Cinereous vulture	Accipitridae	Aegypius monachus (Linnaeus, 1766)	42
Lappet-faced vulture	Accipitridae	Torgos tracheliotos (Forster, JR, 1796)	43
Hooded vulture	Accipitridae	Necrosyrtes monachus (Temminck, 1823)	44
Himalayan vulture	Accipitridae	Gyps himalayensis Hume, 1869	45
White-rumped vulture	Accipitridae	Gyps bengalensis (Gmelin, JF, 1788)	46
White-backed vulture	Accipitridae	Gyps africanus Salvadori, 1865	47
Indian vulture	Accipitridae	Gyps indicus (Scopoli, 1786)	48
Slender-billed vulture	Accipitridae	Gyps tenuirostris Gray, GR, 1844	49
Cape vulture	Accipitridae	Gyps coprotheres (Forster, JR, 1798)	50
Rüppell's vulture	Accipitridae	Gyps rueppelli (Brehm, AE, 1852)	51
Griffon vulture	Accipitridae	Gyps fulvus (Hablizl, 1783)	52
Great Nicobar serpent eagle	Accipitridae	Spilornis klossi Richmond, 1902	53
Sulawesi serpent eagle	Accipitridae	Spilornis rufipectus Gould, 1858	54
Mountain serpent eagle	Accipitridae	Spilornis kinabaluensis Sclater, WL, 1919	55
Crested serpent eagle	Accipitridae	Spilornis cheela (Latham, 1790)	56
Philippine serpent eagle	Accipitridae	Spilornis holospilus (Vigors, 1831)	57
Andaman serpent eagle	Accipitridae	Spilornis elgini (Blyth, 1863)	58
Philippine eagle	Accipitridae	Pithecophaga jefferyi Ogilvie-Grant, 1896	59
Bateleur	Accipitridae	Terathopius ecaudatus (Daudin, 1800)	60
Western banded snake eagle	Accipitridae	Circaetus cinerascens Müller, JW, 1851	61
Southern banded snake eagle	Accipitridae	Circaetus fasciolatus Kaup, 1847	62
Congo serpent eagle	Accipitridae	Circaetus spectabilis (Schlegel, 1863)	63
Beaudouin's snake eagle	Accipitridae	Circaetus beaudouini Verreaux, J & des Murs, 1862	64
Black-chested snake eagle	Accipitridae	Circaetus pectoralis Smith, A, 1829	65
Short-toed snake eagle	Accipitridae	Circaetus gallicus (Gmelin, JF, 1788)	66
Brown snake eagle	Accipitridae	Circaetus cinereus Vieillot, 1818	67
Bat hawk	Accipitridae	Macheiramphus alcinus Bonaparte, 1850	68
Papuan eagle	Accipitridae	Harpyopsis novaeguineae Salvadori, 1875	69
Crested eagle	Accipitridae	Morphnus guianensis (Daudin, 1800)	70
Harpy eagle	Accipitridae	Harpia harpyja (Linnaeus, 1758)	71
Crowned eagle	Accipitridae	Stephanoaetus coronatus (Linnaeus, 1766)	72
Wallace's hawk-eagle	Accipitridae	Nisaetus nanus (Wallace, 1868)	73
Legge's hawk-eagle	Accipitridae	Nisaetus kelaarti (Legge, 1878)	74
Mountain hawk-eagle	Accipitridae	Nisaetus nipalensis Hodgson, 1836	75
Blyth's hawk-eagle	Accipitridae	Nisaetus alboniger Blyth, 1845	76
Javan hawk-eagle	Accipitridae	Nisaetus bartelsi (Stresemann, 1924)	77
Sulawesi hawk-eagle	Accipitridae	Nisaetus lanceolatus (Temminck & Schlegel, 1845)	78
Pinsker's hawk-eagle	Accipitridae	Nisaetus pinskeri (Preleuthner & Gamauf, 1998)	79
Philippine hawk-eagle	Accipitridae	Nisaetus philippensis (Gould, 1863)	80
Changeable hawk-eagle	Accipitridae	Nisaetus cirrhatus (Gmelin, JF, 1788)	81
Flores hawk-eagle	Accipitridae	Nisaetus floris (Hartert, EJO, 1898)	82
Black hawk-eagle	Accipitridae	Spizaetus tyrannus (Wied-Neuwied, M, 1820)	83
Black-and-white hawk-eagle	Accipitridae	Spizaetus melanoleucus (Vieillot, 1816)	84
Ornate hawk-eagle	Accipitridae	Spizaetus ornatus (Daudin, 1800)	85
Black-and-chestnut eagle	Accipitridae	Spizaetus isidori (des Murs, 1845)	86
Rufous-bellied eagle	Accipitridae	Lophotriorchis kienerii (de Sparre, 1835)	87
Martial eagle	Accipitridae	Polemaetus bellicosus (Daudin, 1800)	88
Long-crested eagle	Accipitridae	Lophaetus occipitalis (Daudin, 1800)	89
Black eagle	Accipitridae	Ictinaetus malaiensis (Temminck, 1822)	90
Indian spotted eagle	Accipitridae	Clanga hastata (Lesson, RP, 1831)	91
Lesser spotted eagle	Accipitridae	Clanga pomarina (Brehm, CL, 1831)	92
Greater spotted eagle	Accipitridae	Clanga clanga (Pallas, 1811)	93
Wahlberg's eagle	Accipitridae	Hieraaetus wahlbergi (Sundevall, 1850)	94
Ayres's hawk-eagle	Accipitridae	Hieraaetus ayresii (Gurney, JH Sr, 1862)	95
Pygmy eagle	Accipitridae	Hieraaetus weiskei (Reichenow, 1900)	96
Booted eagle	Accipitridae	Hieraaetus pennatus (Gmelin, JF, 1788)	97
Little eagle	Accipitridae	Hieraaetus morphnoides (Gould, 1841)	98
Steppe eagle	Accipitridae	Aquila nipalensis Hodgson, 1833	99
Tawny eagle	Accipitridae	Aquila rapax (Temminck, 1828)	100
Spanish imperial eagle	Accipitridae	Aquila adalberti Brehm, CL, 1861	101
Eastern imperial eagle	Accipitridae	Aquila heliaca Savigny, 1809	102
Cassin's hawk-eagle	Accipitridae	Aquila africana (Cassin, 1865)	103
Golden eagle	Accipitridae	Aquila chrysaetos (Linnaeus, 1758)	104
Bonelli's eagle	Accipitridae	Aquila fasciata Vieillot, 1822	105
African hawk-eagle	Accipitridae	Aquila spilogaster (Bonaparte, 1850)	106
Verreaux's eagle	Accipitridae	Aquila verreauxii Lesson, RP, 1831	107
Gurney's eagle	Accipitridae	Aquila gurneyi Gray, GR, 1861	108
Wedge-tailed eagle	Accipitridae	Aquila audax (Latham, 1801)	109
Crested goshawk	Accipitridae	Lophospiza trivirgata (Temminck, 1824)	110
Sulawesi goshawk	Accipitridae	Lophospiza griseiceps (Kaup, 1848)	111
Gabar goshawk	Accipitridae	Micronisus gabar (Daudin, 1800)	112
Long-tailed hawk	Accipitridae	Urotriorchis macrourus (Hartlaub, 1855)	113
Dark chanting goshawk	Accipitridae	Melierax metabates Heuglin, 1861	114
Eastern chanting goshawk	Accipitridae	Melierax poliopterus Cabanis, 1868	115
Pale chanting goshawk	Accipitridae	Melierax canorus (Thunberg, 1799)	116
Lizard buzzard	Accipitridae	Kaupifalco monogrammicus (Temminck, 1824)	117
Chestnut-flanked sparrowhawk	Accipitridae	Aerospiza castanilius Bonaparte, 1853	118
African goshawk	Accipitridae	Aerospiza tachiro (Daudin, 1800)	119
Red-thighed sparrowhawk	Accipitridae	Tachyspiza erythropus (Hartlaub, 1855)	120
Little sparrowhawk	Accipitridae	Tachyspiza minulla (Daudin, 1800)	121
Besra	Accipitridae	Tachyspiza virgata (Temminck, 1822)	122
Dwarf sparrowhawk	Accipitridae	Tachyspiza nanus (Blasius, W, 1897)	123
Rufous-necked sparrowhawk	Accipitridae	Tachyspiza erythrauchen Gray, GR, 1861	124
Collared sparrowhawk	Accipitridae	Tachyspiza cirrocephala (Vieillot, 1817)	125
New Britain sparrowhawk	Accipitridae	Tachyspiza brachyura (Ramsay, EP, 1880)	126
Vinous-breasted sparrowhawk	Accipitridae	Tachyspiza rhodogaster (Schlegel, 1862)	127
Japanese sparrowhawk	Accipitridae	Tachyspiza gularis (Temminck & Schlegel, 1845)	128
Levant sparrowhawk	Accipitridae	Tachyspiza brevipes (Severtsov, 1850)	129
Shikra	Accipitridae	Tachyspiza badia (Gmelin, JF, 1788)	130
Nicobar sparrowhawk	Accipitridae	Tachyspiza butleri (Gurney, JH Jr, 1898)	131
Chinese sparrowhawk	Accipitridae	Tachyspiza soloensis (Horsfield, 1821)	132
Frances's sparrowhawk	Accipitridae	Tachyspiza francesiae Smith, A, 1834	133
Spot-tailed sparrowhawk	Accipitridae	Tachyspiza trinotata Bonaparte, 1850	134
Grey-headed goshawk	Accipitridae	Tachyspiza poliocephala Gray, GR, 1858	135
New Britain goshawk	Accipitridae	Tachyspiza princeps Mayr, 1934	136
Grey goshawk	Accipitridae	Tachyspiza novaehollandiae (Gmelin, JF, 1788)	137
Variable goshawk	Accipitridae	Tachyspiza hiogaster (Müller, S, 1841)	138
Imitator goshawk	Accipitridae	Tachyspiza imitator Hartert, EJO, 1926	139
Black-mantled goshawk	Accipitridae	Tachyspiza melanochlamys (Salvadori, 1876)	140
Pied goshawk	Accipitridae	Tachyspiza albogularis Gray, GR, 1870	141
Fiji goshawk	Accipitridae	Tachyspiza rufitorques (Peale, 1849)	142
Moluccan goshawk	Accipitridae	Tachyspiza henicogramma (Gray, GR, 1861)	143
Slaty-mantled goshawk	Accipitridae	Tachyspiza luteoschistacea Rothschild & Hartert, EJO, 1926	144
White-bellied goshawk	Accipitridae	Tachyspiza haplochroa Sclater, PL, 1859	145
Brown goshawk	Accipitridae	Tachyspiza fasciata (Vigors & Horsfield, 1827)	146
Chestnut-shouldered goshawk	Accipitridae	Erythrotriorchis buergersi (Reichenow, 1914)	147
Red goshawk	Accipitridae	Erythrotriorchis radiatus (Latham, 1801)	148
Grey-bellied hawk	Accipitridae	Accipiter poliogaster (Temminck, 1824)	149
Ovambo sparrowhawk	Accipitridae	Accipiter ovampensis Gurney, JH Sr, 1875	150
Madagascar sparrowhawk	Accipitridae	Accipiter madagascariensis Verreaux, J, 1833	151
Sharp-shinned hawk	Accipitridae	Accipiter striatus Vieillot, 1808	152
White-breasted hawk	Accipitridae	Accipiter chionogaster (Kaup, 1852)	153
Plain-breasted hawk	Accipitridae	Accipiter ventralis Sclater, PL, 1866	154
Rufous-thighed hawk	Accipitridae	Accipiter erythronemius (Kaup, 1850)	155
Eurasian sparrowhawk	Accipitridae	Accipiter nisus (Linnaeus, 1758)	156
Rufous-breasted sparrowhawk	Accipitridae	Accipiter rufiventris Smith, A, 1830	157
Bicolored hawk	Accipitridae	Astur bicolor (Vieillot, 1817)	158
Chilean hawk	Accipitridae	Astur chilensis Philippi & Landbeck, 1864	159
Cooper's hawk	Accipitridae	Astur cooperii (Bonaparte, 1828)	160
Gundlach's hawk	Accipitridae	Astur gundlachi Lawrence, 1860	161
Eurasian goshawk	Accipitridae	Astur gentilis (Linnaeus, 1758)	162
American goshawk	Accipitridae	Astur atricapillus (Wilson, A, 1812)	163
Meyer's goshawk	Accipitridae	Astur meyerianus (Sharpe, 1878)	164
Black sparrowhawk	Accipitridae	Astur melanoleucus Smith, A, 1830	165
Henst's goshawk	Accipitridae	Astur henstii (Schlegel, 1873)	166
Doria's hawk	Accipitridae	Megatriorchis doriae Salvadori & D'Albertis, 1875	167
Spotted harrier	Accipitridae	Circus assimilis Jardine & Selby, 1828	168
Pallid harrier	Accipitridae	Circus macrourus (Gmelin, SG, 1770)	169
Black harrier	Accipitridae	Circus maurus (Temminck, 1828)	170
Hen harrier	Accipitridae	Circus cyaneus (Linnaeus, 1766)	171
Northern harrier	Accipitridae	Circus hudsonius (Linnaeus, 1766)	172
Cinereous harrier	Accipitridae	Circus cinereus Vieillot, 1816	173
Long-winged harrier	Accipitridae	Circus buffoni (Gmelin, JF, 1788)	174
Montagu's harrier	Accipitridae	Circus pygargus (Linnaeus, 1758)	175
Pied harrier	Accipitridae	Circus melanoleucos (Pennant, 1769)	176
Western marsh harrier	Accipitridae	Circus aeruginosus (Linnaeus, 1758)	177
African marsh harrier	Accipitridae	Circus ranivorus (Daudin, 1800)	178
Eastern marsh harrier	Accipitridae	Circus spilonotus Kaup, 1847	179
Papuan harrier	Accipitridae	Circus spilothorax Salvadori & D'Albertis, 1875	180
Swamp harrier	Accipitridae	Circus approximans Peale, 1849	181
Malagasy harrier	Accipitridae	Circus macrosceles Newton, A, 1863	182
Reunion harrier	Accipitridae	Circus maillardi Verreaux, J, 1862	183
Tiny hawk	Accipitridae	Microspizias superciliosus (Linnaeus, 1766)	184
Semicollared hawk	Accipitridae	Microspizias collaris (Sclater, PL, 1860)	185
Double-toothed kite	Accipitridae	Harpagus bidentatus (Latham, 1790)	186
Rufous-thighed kite	Accipitridae	Harpagus diodon (Temminck, 1823)	187
Red kite	Accipitridae	Milvus milvus (Linnaeus, 1758)	188
Black kite	Accipitridae	Milvus migrans (Boddaert, 1783)	189
Yellow-billed kite	Accipitridae	Milvus aegyptius (Gmelin, JF, 1788)	190
Brahminy kite	Accipitridae	Haliastur indus (Boddaert, 1783)	191
Whistling kite	Accipitridae	Haliastur sphenurus (Vieillot, 1818)	192
Steller's sea eagle	Accipitridae	Haliaeetus pelagicus (Pallas, 1811)	193
Pallas's fish eagle	Accipitridae	Haliaeetus leucoryphus (Pallas, 1771)	194
White-tailed eagle	Accipitridae	Haliaeetus albicilla (Linnaeus, 1758)	195
Bald eagle	Accipitridae	Haliaeetus leucocephalus (Linnaeus, 1766)	196
African fish eagle	Accipitridae	Icthyophaga vocifer (Daudin, 1800)	197
Madagascar fish eagle	Accipitridae	Icthyophaga vociferoides (des Murs, 1845)	198
White-bellied sea eagle	Accipitridae	Icthyophaga leucogaster (Gmelin, JF, 1788)	199
Sanford's sea eagle	Accipitridae	Icthyophaga sanfordi (Mayr, 1935)	200
Lesser fish eagle	Accipitridae	Icthyophaga humilis (Müller, S & Schlegel, 1841)	201
Grey-headed fish eagle	Accipitridae	Icthyophaga ichthyaetus (Horsfield, 1821)	202
Rufous-winged buzzard	Accipitridae	Butastur liventer (Temminck, 1827)	203
Grasshopper buzzard	Accipitridae	Butastur rufipennis (Sundevall, 1850)	204
White-eyed buzzard	Accipitridae	Butastur teesa (Franklin, 1831)	205
Grey-faced buzzard	Accipitridae	Butastur indicus (Gmelin, JF, 1788)	206
Mississippi kite	Accipitridae	Ictinia mississippiensis (Wilson, A, 1811)	207
Plumbeous kite	Accipitridae	Ictinia plumbea (Gmelin, JF, 1788)	208
Crane hawk	Accipitridae	Geranospiza caerulescens (Vieillot, 1817)	209
Black-collared hawk	Accipitridae	Busarellus nigricollis (Latham, 1790)	210
Snail kite	Accipitridae	Rostrhamus sociabilis (Vieillot, 1817)	211
Slender-billed kite	Accipitridae	Helicolestes hamatus (Temminck, 1821)	212
Barred hawk	Accipitridae	Morphnarchus princeps (Sclater, PL, 1865)	213
Plumbeous hawk	Accipitridae	Cryptoleucopteryx plumbea (Salvin, 1872)	214
Slate-colored hawk	Accipitridae	Buteogallus schistaceus (Sundevall, 1850)	215
Common black hawk	Accipitridae	Buteogallus anthracinus (Deppe, 1830)	216
Cuban black hawk	Accipitridae	Buteogallus gundlachii (Cabanis, 1855)	217
Rufous crab hawk	Accipitridae	Buteogallus aequinoctialis (Gmelin, JF, 1788)	218
Savanna hawk	Accipitridae	Buteogallus meridionalis (Latham, 1790)	219
White-necked hawk	Accipitridae	Buteogallus lacernulatus (Temminck, 1827)	220
Great black hawk	Accipitridae	Buteogallus urubitinga (Gmelin, JF, 1788)	221
Solitary eagle	Accipitridae	Buteogallus solitarius (Tschudi, 1844)	222
Chaco eagle	Accipitridae	Buteogallus coronatus (Vieillot, 1817)	223
Roadside hawk	Accipitridae	Rupornis magnirostris (Gmelin, JF, 1788)	224
Harris's hawk	Accipitridae	Parabuteo unicinctus (Temminck, 1824)	225
White-rumped hawk	Accipitridae	Parabuteo leucorrhous (Quoy & Gaimard, 1824)	226
Grey-backed hawk	Accipitridae	Pseudastur occidentalis (Salvin, 1876)	227
White hawk	Accipitridae	Pseudastur albicollis (Latham, 1790)	228
Mantled hawk	Accipitridae	Pseudastur polionotus (Kaup, 1847)	229
White-tailed hawk	Accipitridae	Geranoaetus albicaudatus (Vieillot, 1816)	230
Variable hawk	Accipitridae	Geranoaetus polyosoma (Quoy & Gaimard, 1824)	231
Black-chested buzzard-eagle	Accipitridae	Geranoaetus melanoleucus (Vieillot, 1819)	232
Semiplumbeous hawk	Accipitridae	Leucopternis semiplumbeus Lawrence, 1861	233
Black-faced hawk	Accipitridae	Leucopternis melanops (Latham, 1790)	234
White-browed hawk	Accipitridae	Leucopternis kuhli Bonaparte, 1850	235
Bermuda hawk	Accipitridae	Bermuteo avivorus Olson, 2008	236
Grey hawk	Accipitridae	Buteo plagiatus (Schlegel, 1862)	237
Grey-lined hawk	Accipitridae	Buteo nitidus (Latham, 1790)	238
Broad-winged hawk	Accipitridae	Buteo platypterus (Vieillot, 1823)	239
Red-shouldered hawk	Accipitridae	Buteo lineatus (Gmelin, JF, 1788)	240
Ridgway's hawk	Accipitridae	Buteo ridgwayi (Cory, 1883)	241
Zone-tailed hawk	Accipitridae	Buteo albonotatus Kaup, 1847	242
Hawaiian hawk	Accipitridae	Buteo solitarius Peale, 1849	243
White-throated hawk	Accipitridae	Buteo albigula Philippi, 1899	244
Short-tailed hawk	Accipitridae	Buteo brachyurus Vieillot, 1816	245
Swainson's hawk	Accipitridae	Buteo swainsoni Bonaparte, 1838	246
Galapagos hawk	Accipitridae	Buteo galapagoensis (Gould, 1837)	247
Red-tailed hawk	Accipitridae	Buteo jamaicensis (Gmelin, JF, 1788)	248
Rufous-tailed hawk	Accipitridae	Buteo ventralis Gould, 1837	249
Rough-legged buzzard	Accipitridae	Buteo lagopus (Pontoppidan, 1763)	250
Ferruginous hawk	Accipitridae	Buteo regalis (Gray, GR, 1844)	251
Red-necked buzzard	Accipitridae	Buteo auguralis Salvadori, 1866	252
Augur buzzard	Accipitridae	Buteo augur (Rüppell, 1836)	253
Jackal buzzard	Accipitridae	Buteo rufofuscus (Forster, JR, 1798)	254
Mountain buzzard	Accipitridae	Buteo oreophilus Hartert, EJO & Neumann, 1914	255
Common buzzard	Accipitridae	Buteo buteo (Linnaeus, 1758)	256
Forest buzzard	Accipitridae	Buteo trizonatus Rudebeck, 1957	257
Madagascar buzzard	Accipitridae	Buteo brachypterus Hartlaub, 1860	258
Socotra buzzard	Accipitridae	Buteo socotraensis Porter & Kirwan, 2010	259
Cape Verde buzzard	Accipitridae	Buteo bannermani Swann, 1919	260
Long-legged buzzard	Accipitridae	Buteo rufinus (Cretzschmar, 1829)	261
Upland buzzard	Accipitridae	Buteo hemilasius Temminck & Schlegel, 1845	262
Himalayan buzzard	Accipitridae	Buteo refectus Portenko, 1935	263
Eastern buzzard	Accipitridae	Buteo japonicus Temminck & Schlegel, 1845	264

== See also ==
- List of Accipitriformes by population
- List of falcon species
- List of owl species
