= List of Accipitriformes by population =

This is a list of Accipitriformes species by global population. This list follows IUCN classifications for species names and taxonomy. Where IUCN classifications differ from other ornithological authorities, alternative names and species classifications are noted.

While numbers are estimates, they have been made by the experts in their fields. For more information on how these estimates were ascertained, see Wikipedia's articles on population biology and population ecology. While not all of these species have had their populations quantified, species without estimates are also listed below in a separate table.

The order Cathartiformes (containing family Cathartidae, the New World vultures) has been folded into Accipitriformes by the International Ornithological Congress. Other authorities, such as the American Ornithological Society, maintain Cathartiformes and Accipitriformes as two distinct orders. Because Cathartidae has only seven species, they are included in this list for simplicity.

Version 15.1 of the IOC World Bird List describes 266 members of Accipitriformes when including Cathartidae (259 without). As of December 2025, IUCN/BirdLife International have evaluated 259 of these species, excepting 7 being maintained as subspecies of other birds in this list.

There is one species listed as a member of Accipitriformes which is extinct:

- Bermuda hawk (Bermuteo avivorous) - last observed in 1603.

== Species by global population ==
| Common name | Binomial name | Population | Status | Trend | Notes | Image |
|---|---|---|---|---|---|---|
| Cuban kite | Chondrohierax wilsonii | 50-249 | CR | ▼ | | |
| California condor | Gymnogyps californianus | 93 | CR | ▲ | There are currently 201 adults in the wild that are old enough to breed. The IUCN counts re-introduced individuals separately. | |
| Malagasy harrier | Circus macrosceles | 100-499 | EN | ▼ | | |
| Philippine eagle | Pithecophaga jefferyi | 128-924 | CR | ▼ | | |
| Great Nicobar serpent-eagle | Spilornis klossi | 150-370 | EN | ? | Best estimate of population is 150-180 mature individuals. | |
| Réunion marsh-harrier (Réunion harrier) | Circus maillardi | 200-560 | EN | ▼ | | |
| Madagascar fish-eagle | Icthyophaga vociferoides | 240 | CR | ▼ | IUCN still places species in genus Haliaeetus. | |
| Socotra buzzard | Buteo socotraensis | 250-500 | VU | ▼ | | |
| White-collared kite | Leptodon forbesi | 250-999 | EN | ▼ | | |
| Black harrier | Circus maurus | 251-999 | EN | ▼ | | |
| Galapagos hawk | Buteo galapagoensis | 270-330 | VU | Steady | | |
| Javan hawk-eagle | Nisaetus bartelsi | 300-1,200 | EN | ▼ | | |
| Flores hawk-eagle | Nisaetus floris | 320-1,500 | EN | ▼ | | |
| Ridgway's hawk | Buteo ridgwayi | 322 | CR | ▲ | | |
| Sanford's sea eagle | Icthyophaga sanfordi | 400-999 | VU | ▼ | IUCN still places species in genus Haliaeetus. | |
| Henst's goshawk | Astur henstii | 500-999 | VU | ▼ | | Accipiter_henstii |
| Gundlach's hawk | Astur gundlachi | 500-1,000 | EN | ▼ | IUCN assessment still places bird in genus Accipiter. | Accipiter_gundlachi_(photo_by_Roberto_Jovel) |
| Nicobar sparrowhawk | Tachyspiza butleri | 500-2,500 | VU | ▼ | IUCN assessment still places bird in genus Accipiter. | |
| Southern banded snake-eagle | Circaetus fasciolatus | 670-2,000 | NT | ▼ | | Circaetus_fasciolatus,_iSimangaliso_Wetland_Park,_KwaZulu_Natal,_South_Africa_3 |
| Mountain buzzard | Buteo oreophilus | 670-6,700 | NT | ▼ | | |
| Forest buzzard | Buteo trizonatus | 670-6,700 | NT | Steady | | |
| White-throated hawk | Buteo albigula | 670-6,700 | LC | ? | Total population is estimated to be 1,000-10,000 individuals. | Buteo_albigula_287867431 |
| Rufous-tailed hawk | Buteo ventralis | 700-3,300 | EN | ▼ | | |
| Imitator goshawk | Tachyspiza imitator | 700-5,000 | NT | ▼ | Best estimate for population of mature individuals is 1,001-2000. IUCN assessment still places bird in genus Accipiter. | |
| Slender-billed vulture | Gyps tenuirostris | 730-870 | CR | ▼ | Total population is estimated to be 1,100-1,300 individuals. | |
| Crowned solitary eagle (Chaco eagle) | Buteogallus coronatus | 800-2,000 | EN | ▼ | | |
| Red goshawk | Erythrotriorchis radiatus | 900-1,400 | EN | ▼ | Best estimate for population of mature individuals is 1,340. | |
| North Philippine hawk-eagle (Philippine hawk-eagle) | Nisaetus philippensis | 1,000-2,000 | EN | ▼ | | |
| Letter-winged kite | Elanus scriptus | 1,000-2,000 | NT | Steady | Best estimate for population of mature individuals is 1,000-1,500. | |
| Madagascar serpent eagle | Eutriorchis astur | 1,000-2,150 | EN | ▼ | | |
| Pallas's fish-eagle | Haliaeetus leucoryphus | 1,000-2,499 | EN | ▼ | | |
| Slaty-backed goshawk (Slaty-mantled goshawk) | Tachyspiza luteoschistacea | 1,000-2,499 | VU | ▼ | IUCN assessment gives binomial name Accipiter luteoschistaceus. | |
| Cuban black hawk | Buteogallus gundlachii | 1,000-2,499 | NT | ▼ | | |
| Black solitary eagle (Solitary eagle) | Buteogallus solitarius | 1,000-2,499 | NT | ▼ | | |
| Andaman serpent-eagle | Spilornis elgini | 1,000-4,000 | VU | ▼ | | |
| Rufous crab-hawk | Buteogallus aequinoctialis | 1,000-9,999 | NT | ▼ | Total population has been estimated "to be in the thousands" assuming its distribution is similar across its habitat. | |
| Spanish imperial eagle | Aquila adalberti | 1,060-1,080 | VU | ▲ | | |
| Mountain hawk-eagle | Nisaetus nipalensis | 1,200-6,700 | NT | ▼ | IOC taxonomy classifications split this species into one additional species: Legge's hawk-eagle. IUCN/BirdLife International maintains this bird as a subspecies of mountain hawk-eagle. | |
| South Philippine hawk-eagle (Pinsker's hawk-eagle) | Nisaetus pinskeri | 1,300-3,600 | EN | ▼ | | |
| Black-and-chestnut eagle | Spizaetus isidori | 1,400-4,200 | EN | ▼ | | |
| Moluccan goshawk | Tachyspiza henicogrammus | 1,500-7,000 | NT | ▼ | Total population is estimated to be 2,500-9,999 individuals.IUCN assessment still places bird in genus Accipiter. | |
| Bearded vulture (Lammergeier) | Gypaetus barbatus | 1,675-6,700 | NT | ▼ | | |
| Hawaiian hawk | Buteo solitarius | 1,700-2,500 | NT | Steady | | |
| White-headed vulture | Trigonoceps occipitalis | 2,500-9,999 | CR | ▼ | | |
| Red-headed vulture | Sarcogyps calvus | 2,500-9,999 | CR | ▼ | Total population is estimated to be 3,500-15,000 individuals. Population is currently experiencing a >99% decline over three generations. | |
| Beaudouin's snake-eagle | Circaetus beaudouini | 2,500-9,999 | VU | ▼ | | |
| New Britain goshawk | Tachyspiza princeps | 2,500-9,999 | VU | ▼ | IUCN assessment still places bird in genus Accipiter. | |
| New Britain sparrowhawk | Tachyspiza brachyura | 2,500-9,999 | VU | ▼ | IUCN assessment gives binomial name Accipiter brachyurus. | |
| Wallace's hawk-eagle | Nisaetus nanus | 2,500-9,999 | VU | ▼ | Total population is estimated to be 3,500-15,000 individuals. | |
| Gurney's eagle | Aquila gurneyi | 2,500-9,999 | NT | ▼ | | |
| Mantled hawk | Pseudastur polionotus | 2,500-9,999 | NT | ▼ | | |
| White-necked hawk | Buteogallus lacernulatus | 2,500-9,999 | NT | ▼ | | |
| Chestnut-shouldered goshawk | Erythrotriorchis buergersi | 2,500-9,999 | NT | ▼ | | |
| Grey goshawk | Tachyspiza novaehollandiae | 2,500-9,999 | LC | ▼ | IUCN assessment still places bird in genus Accipiter. | |
| Grey-backed hawk | Pseudastur occidentalis | 2,500-10,000 | VU | ▼ | Best estimate for population of mature individuals is 2,600. | Gray-backed_Hawk_-_South-Ecuador_S4E8637_(15478568822) |
| Kinabalu serpent-eagle (Mountain serpent eagle) | Spilornis kinabaluensis | 2,500-19,999 | NT | ▼ | Best estimate for population of mature individuals is 5,000-9,999. | |
| White-bellied sea-eagle | Icthyophaga leucogaster | 2,600-41,000 | LC | ▼ | IUCN still places species in genus Haliaeetus. | |
| Papuan eagle | Harpyopsis novaeguineae | 3,200-4,000 | VU | ▼ | | |
| Madagascar sparrowhawk | Accipiter madagascariensis | 3,300-6,700 | NT | ▼ | | |
| Steller's sea-eagle | Haliaeetus pelagicus | 3,600-4,670 | VU | ▼ | Total population is estimated to be 4,600-7,000 individuals. | |
| Greater spotted eagle | Clanga clanga | 3,900-10,000 | VU | ▼ | | |
| White-rumped vulture | Gyps bengalensis | 4,000-6,000 | CR | ▼ | Once described as "possibly the most abundant large bird of prey in the world", numbering millions. Catastrophic population collapse beginning in the 1990s caused by diclofenac, leading to >99% decline over three generations. | |
| White-bellied goshawk | Tachyspiza haplochroa | 5,000-9,999 | NT | ▼ | IUCN assessment gives binomial name Accipiter haplochrous. | |
| Indian vulture | Gyps indicus | 5,000-15,000 | CR | ▼ | 99% population collapse over three generations, caused by diclofenac. | |
| Crowned eagle | Stephanoaetus coronatus | 5,000-50,000 | NT | ▼ | | |
| Black honey-buzzard | Henicopernis infuscatus | 6,000-15,000 | VU | ▼ | | |
| Lappet-faced vulture | Torgos tracheliotos | 6,500 | EN | ▼ | Total population is estimated to be 9,200 individuals, which is likely now an overestimate given steep declines. | |
| Andean condor | Vultur gryphus | 6,700 | VU | ▼ | Total population is estimated to be 10,000 individuals, though this is the maximum. | |
| Jerdon's baza | Aviceda jerdoni | 6,700 | LC | ▼ | Total population estimated to be 10,000 individuals. | |
| Brown snake-eagle | Circaetus cinereus | 6,700-67,000 | LC | ▼ | Total population is estimated to be 10,000-100,000 individuals. | |
| Ovambo sparrowhawk | Accipiter ovampensis | 6,700-67,000 | LC | ▲ | | |
| Secretarybird | Sagittarius serpentarius | 6,700-67,000 | EN | ▼ | | |
| Cape vulture | Gyps coprotheres | 9,600-12,800 | VU | ▼ | | |
| Black eagle | Ictinaetus malayensis | 10,000 | LC | ▼ | Value provided is a 2001 estimate for total population. | |
| Martial eagle | Polemaetus bellicosus | >10,000 | EN | ▼ | Total population is estimated to be "probably in tens of thousands." | |
| African cuckoo-hawk | Aviceda cuculoides | >10,000 | LC | Steady | Total population "likely to exceed 10,000 individuals, based on its large range." | |
| Pied harrier | Circus melanoleucos | >10,000 | LC | ▼ | Value provided is the minimum estimate for total population. | |
| Upland buzzard | Buteo hemilasius | >10,000 | LC | Steady | Value provided is the minimum estimate for total population. | |
| Red-necked buzzard | Buteo auguralis | >10,000 | LC | Steady | No collected population data, but "a five-figure population is suspected based on wide distribution." | |
| Semi-collared hawk | Microspizias collaris | 10,000-19,999 | LC | Steady | IUCN assessment still places bird in genus Accipiter. | |
| Plumbeous hawk | Cryptoleucopteryx plumbea | 10,000-19,999 | NT | ▼ | | |
| Levant sparrowhawk | Tachyspiza brevipes | 10,000-19,999 | LC | Steady | IUCN assessment still places bird in genus Accipiter. | |
| Black baza | Aviceda leuphotes | 10,000-50,000 | LC | ▼ | | |
| Bateleur | Terathopius ecaudatus | 10,000-99,999 | EN | ▼ | Population is estimated to be "in the tens of thousands." | |
| Verreaux's eagle | Aquila verreauxii | 10,000-99,999 | LC | Steady | Values given are estimates for the total population. | |
| Swamp harrier | Circus appoximans | 10,000-99,999 | LC | Steady | Total population is estimated to be "in the tens of thousands." | |
| Grey-headed goshawk | Tachyspiza poliocephala | 10,000-99,999 | LC | ▼ | Total population "is estimated to number in the tens of thousands." IUCN assessment still places bird in genus Accipiter. | |
| Little sparrowhawk | Tachyspiza minulla | 10,000-99,999 | LC | Steady | Total population "is estimated to number in the tens of thousands." IUCN assessment gives binomial name Accipiter minullus. | |
| Crested goshawk | Lophospiza trivirgata | 10,000-99,999 | LC | ▼ | Total population "is thought to number in the tens of thousands." IUCN assessment still places bird in genus Accipiter. | |
| Slate-colored hawk | Buteogallus schistaceus | 10,000-99,999 | LC | ▼ | Total population "is estimated to number in the tens of thousands." | |
| Jackal buzzard | Buteo rufofuscus | 10,000-99,999 | LC | Steady | Total population "is estimated to number in the tens of thousands." | |
| Western banded snake-eagle | Circaetus cinerascens | 10,000-100,000 | LC | ▼ | Total population is expected to lie at the lower end of the given range. | |
| Little eagle | Hieraaetus morphnoides | 10,000-100,000 | LC | Steady | | |
| Egyptian vulture | Neophron percnopterus | 12,400-36,000 | EN | ▼ | | |
| Japanese sparrowhawk | Tachyspiza gularis | 13,400-67,000 | LC | Steady | IUCN assessment still places bird in genus Accipiter. | |
| Eastern imperial eagle | Aquila heliaca | 16,000-20,000 | VU | ▼ | | |
| Cinereous vulture | Aegypius monachus | 16,800-22,800 | NT | ▼ | | |
| Pallid harrier | Circus macrourus | 18,000-30,000 | NT | ▼ | | |
| Barred hawk | Morphnarchus princeps | 20,000-49,999 | LC | ▼ | | |
| Ayres's hawk-eagle | Hieraaetus ayresii | 20,000-49,999 | LC | Steady | | |
| Grasshopper buzzard | Butastur rufipennis | 20,000-49,999 | LC | ▼ | | |
| Semiplumbeous hawk | Leucopternis semiplumbeus | 20,000-49,999 | LC | ▼ | | |
| Black-and-white hawk-eagle | Spizaetus melanoleucus | 20,000-49,999 | LC | ▼ | | |
| Bonelli's eagle | Aquila fasciata | 20,000-50,000 | LC | Steady | | |
| White-tailed sea-eagle (White-tailed eagle) | Haliaeetus albicilla | 20,000-60,000 | LC | ▲ | | |
| Rüppell's vulture | Gyps rueppelli | 22,000 | CR | ▼ | | |
| Scissor-tailed kite | Chelictinia riocourii | 30,000-67,000 | VU | ▼ | | |
| Harris's hawk | Parabuteo unicinctus | 30,000-87,000 | LC | ? | | |
| Eastern marsh-harrier | Circus spilonotus | 40,000-60,000 | LC | Steady | | |
| Lesser spotted eagle | Clanga pomarina | 40,000-60,000 | LC | Steady | | |
| Besra | Tachyspiza virgata | 40,000-400,000 | LC | ▼ | IUCN assessment gives binomial name Accipiter virgatus. | |
| Steppe eagle | Aquila nipalensis | 50,000-75,000 | EN | ▼ | | |
| Frances's sparrowhawk | Tachyspiza francesiae | 50,000-99,999 | LC | ▼ | IUCN assessment still places bird in genus Accipiter. | |
| Long-crested eagle | Lophaetus occipitalis | 50,000-99,999 | LC | Steady | Population is estimated as "likely to number in the upper tens of thousands of mature individuals." | |
| Short-toed snake-eagle | Circaetus gallicus | 50,000-99,999 | LC | Steady | | |
| African hawk-eagle | Aquila spilogaster | 50,000-499,999 | LC | ▼ | With regard to total population, it "may be in the six-figure range; however, it is more cautious to assume it lies between the upper tens of thousands and the lower hundreds of thousands." | |
| Tiny hawk | Microspizias superciliosus | 50,000-499,999 | LC | ▼ | IUCN assessment still places bird in genus Accipiter. | Accipiter_superciliosus_Azor_diminuto_Tiny_Hawk_(female)_(8114042342)_(cropped) |
| Black-collared hawk | Busarellus nigricollis | 50,000-499,999 | LC | ▼ | | |
| Black hawk-eagle | Spizaetus tyrannus | 50,000-499,999 | LC | ▼ | | |
| White hawk | Pseudastur albicollis | 50,000-499,999 | LC | ▼ | | |
| Ornate hawk-eagle | Spizaetus ornatus | 50,000-499,999 | NT | ▼ | | |
| Grey-headed kite | Leptodon cayanensis | 50,000-499,999 | LC | ▼ | | |
| Red kite | Milvus milvus | 60,000-70,000 | LC | ▲ | | |
| Himalayan griffon (Himalayan vulture) | Gyps himalayensis | 66,000-334,000 | NT | ▼ | | |
| Oriental honey-buzzard (Crested honey-buzzard) | Pernis ptilorhyncus | 66,666-666,666 | LC | ▼ | | |
| Brahminy kite | Haliastur indus | 67,000 | LC | ▼ | | |
| Wahlberg's eagle | Hieraaetus wahlbergi | 67,000-670,000 | LC | Steady | | |
| Griffon vulture (Eurasian griffon vulture) | Gyps fulvus | 80,000-900,000 | LC | ▲ | | |
| Golden eagle | Aquila chrysaetos | 85,000-160,000 | LC | Steady | | |
| Ferruginous hawk | Buteo regalis | 86,000-140,000 | LC | ▲ | | |
| Black-shouldered kite | Elanus axillaris | >100,000 | LC | ▲ | Value provided is a 2001 estimate for total population. | |
| Variable goshawk | Tachyspiza hiogaster | >100,000 | LC | Steady | Value provided is a 2001 estimate for total population. IUCN assessment still places bird in genus Accipiter. | |
| Grey-faced buzzard | Butastur indicus | >100,000 | LC | ▼ | Value provided is a 2001 estimate for total population, based on migratory bird counts. | Butastur_indicus |
| Harpy eagle | Harpia harpyja | 100,000-250,000 | VU | ▼ | | |
| Long-legged buzzard | Buteo rufinus | 100,000-499,999 | LC | Steady | | Buse_féroce0017_ichkeul© |
| Swallow-tailed kite | Elanoides forficatus | 100,000-499,999 | LC | ? | | |
| Tawny eagle | Aquila rapax | 100,000-499,999 | VU | ▼ | | |
| Osprey | Pandion haliaetus | 100,000-1,200,000 | LC | ▲ | | |
| Hooded vulture | Necrosyrtes monachus | 131,320 | CR | ▼ | Maximum estimate. Total population has a maximum estimate of 197,000 individuals. | |
| Booted eagle | Hieraaetus pennatus | 150,000-195,000 | LC | Steady | | |
| Hook-billed kite | Chondrohierax uncinatus | 200,000 | LC | ▼ | | |
| White-tailed kite | Elanus leucurus | 200,000-300,000 | LC | ▼ | | |
| Bald eagle | Haliaeetus leucocephalus | >200,000 | LC | ▲ | Note that the U.S. Fish & Wildlife Service reports a total population of 316,000 individuals in the contiguous United States. The Alaska Department of Fish & Game estimates an additional 30,000-150,000 within the state. | |
| Palm-nut vulture | Gypohierax angolensis | 240,000 | LC | ▼ | Population estimate is for the total population and was made in the early 1990s; may be outdated. | |
| Chinese sparrowhawk | Tachyspiza soloensis | 268,000-667,000 | LC | ▼ | IUCN assessment still places bird in genus Accipiter. | Accipiter_soloensis_from_iNaturalist_photo_546732260 |
| European honey-buzzard | Pernis apivorus | 290,000-430,000 | LC | Steady | | |
| Sharp-shinned hawk | Accipiter striatus | 300,000-520,000 | LC | ▼ | IOC taxonomy classifications split this species into three additional species: white-breasted hawk, plain-breasted hawk, and rufous-thighed hawk. IUCN/BirdLife International maintains these birds are subspecies of sharp-shinned hawk. | |
| Montagu's harrier | Circus pygargus | 300,000-550,000 | LC | ▼ | | |
| Hen harrier | Circus cyaneus | 330,000-512,000 | LC | ▼ | | |
| Rough-legged buzzard (Rough-legged hawk) | Buteo lagopus | 350,000-800,000 | LC | Steady | | |
| Dark chanting-goshawk | Melierax metabates | >500,000 | LC | ▼ | Value provided is a minimum estimate; given its large range, "a density of one pair per 20 km^{2} would result in a population in the millions. Excluding immatures, the total population is still likely to number in the upper hundreds of thousands." | |
| Shikra | Tachyspiza badia | 500,000-999,999 | LC | Steady | IUCN assessment gives binomial name Accipiter badius. | |
| Bicolored hawk | Astur bicolor | 500,000-4,999,999 | LC | ▼ | IUCN assessment still places bird in genus Accipiter. IOC taxonomy classifications split this species into one additional species: Chilean hawk. IUCN/BirdLife International maintains this bird as a subspecies of bicolored hawk. | |
| Slender-billed kite | Helicolestes hamatus | 500,000-4,999,999 | LC | ▼ | | |
| Great black hawk | Buteogallus urubitinga | 500,000-4,999,999 | LC | ▼ | | |
| Pearl kite | Gampsonyx swainsonii | 500,000-4,999,999 | LC | ▲ | | |
| Crane hawk | Geranospiza caerulescens | 500,000-4,999,999 | LC | ▼ | | |
| Double-toothed kite | Harpagus bidentatus | 500,000-4,999,999 | LC | ▼ | | |
| Lesser yellow-headed vulture | Cathartes burrovianus | 500,000-4,999,999 | LC | Steady | | |
| Plumbeous kite | Ictinia plumbea | 500,000-4,999,999 | LC | ▼ | | |
| Grey-lined hawk | Buteo nitidus | 500,000-4,999,999 | LC | Steady | | |
| Mississippi kite | Ictinia mississippiensis | 540,000-880,000 | LC | ▲ | | |
| Western marsh-harrier | Circus aeruginosus | 600,000-1,100,000 | LC | Steady | | |
| Northern harrier | Circus hudsonius | 730,000-920,000 | LC | ▼ | Best estimate for number of mature individuals is 820,000. | |
| Cooper's hawk | Astur cooperii | 770,000-920,000 | LC | ▲ | IUCN still places bird in genus Accipiter. | |
| Swainson's hawk | Buteo swainsoni | 900,000 | LC | ▲ | | |
| African harrier-hawk | Polyboroides typus | < 1,000,000 | LC | ▼ | Species has a wide range, but irregular distribution; a 2001 estimate suggests a "total population probably under one million individuals." | |
| Northern goshawk (Eurasian goshawk) | Astur gentilis | 1,000,000-2,499,999 | LC | ? | IUCN assessment still places bird in genus Accipiter. IOC taxonomy classifications split this species into one additional species: American goshawk. IUCN/BirdLife International maintains this bird as a subspecies of northern goshawk. | |
| Augur buzzard | Buteo augur | >1,000,000 | LC | ▼ | Value provided is a very rough estimate. | |
| Broad-winged hawk | Buteo platypterus | 1,600,000-2,000,000 | LC | ▲ | | |
| Red-shouldered hawk | Buteo lineatus | 1,900,000 | LC | ▲ | | |
| Common black hawk | Buteogallus anthracinus | 2,000,000 | LC | ▼ | | |
| Zone-tailed hawk | Buteo albonotatus | 2,000,000 | LC | Steady | | |
| Grey hawk | Buteo plagiatus | 2,000,000 | LC | Steady | | |
| Snail kite | Rostrhamus sociabilis | 2,000,000 | LC | Steady | | |
| White-tailed hawk | Geranoaetus albicaudatus | 2,000,000 | LC | ? | | |
| Eurasian sparrowhawk | Accipiter nisus | 2,000,000-3,200,000 | LC | Steady | | |
| Red-tailed hawk | Buteo jamaicensis | 2,600,000-3,100,000 | LC | ▲ | | |
| Eurasian buzzard (Common buzzard) | Buteo buteo | 4,000,000 | LC | ▲ | IOC taxonomy classifications split this species into one additional species: Cape Verde buzzard. IUCN/BirdLife International maintains this bird as a subspecies of Eurasian buzzard. | |
| Black kite | Milvus migrans | 4,000,000 - 5,700,000 | LC | Steady | | |
| Roadside hawk | Rupornis magnirostris | 5,000,000-50,000,000 | LC | ▲ | | |
| Savanna hawk | Buteogallus meridionalis | 5,000,000-50,000,000 | LC | Steady | | |
| Short-tailed hawk | Buteo brachyurus | 5,000,000-50,000,000 | LC | Steady | | |
| Turkey vulture | Cathartes aura | 28,000,000 | LC | Steady | No population estimates are provided by IUCN. Value provided is estimate of total population from Partners in Flight. | |
| American black vulture (Black vulture) | Coragyps atratus | 50,000,000-99,999,999 | LC | ? | | |

== Species without population estimates ==
| Common name | Binomial name | Population | Status | Trend | Notes | Image |
|---|---|---|---|---|---|---|
| White-backed vulture | Gyps africanus | unknown | CR | ▼ | In 1992, it was estimated there were 270,000 white-backed vultures. This species is currently facing a major population crash, and has declined by 63-89% in the last 40 years. | |
| Grey-bellied goshawk (Grey-bellied hawk) | Accipiter poliogaster | unknown | NT | ▼ | | Accipiter_poliogaster_19994665 |
| Indian spotted eagle | Clanga hastata | unknown | NT | ▼ | Population is "plausibly less than 10,000 individuals," but not enough data exists for an estimate. | |
| Lesser fish-eagle | Ichthyophaga humilis | unknown | NT | ▼ | | |
| Grey-headed fish-eagle | Ichthyophaga ichthyaetus | unknown | NT | ▼ | | |
| Rufous-bellied eagle | Lophotriorchis kienerii | unknown | NT | ▼ | | |
| Crested eagle | Morphnus guianensis | unknown | NT | ▼ | | |
| Rufous-breasted sparrowhawk | Accipiter rufiventris | unknown | LC | ? | | |
| Chestnut-flanked sparrowhawk | Aerospiza castanilius | unknown | LC | ▼ | IUCN assessment still places bird in genus Accipiter. | |
| African goshawk | Aerospiza tachiro | unknown | LC | ▼ | IUCN assessment still places bird in genus Accipiter. | |
| Black sparrowhawk | Astur melanoleucus | unknown | LC | ▼ | IUCN assessment still places bird in genus Accipiter. | |
| Cassin's hawk-eagle | Aquila africanus | unknown | LC | ▼ | | Cassin's_hawk-eagle,_Mt.Cameroon |
| Wedge-tailed eagle | Aquila audax | unknown | LC | ? | | |
| Meyer's goshawk | Astur meyerianus | unknown | LC | ▼ | IUCN assessment still places bird in genus Accipiter. | Accipiter_meyerianus |
| Madagascar cuckoo-hawk | Aviceda madagascariensis | unknown | LC | ▼ | | |
| Pacific baza | Aviceda subcristata | unknown | LC | ▼ | | |
| Rufous-winged buzzard | Butastur liventer | unknown | LC | ▼ | | |
| White-eyed buzzard | Butastur teesa | unknown | LC | Steady | | |
| Madagascar buzzard | Buteo brachypterus | unknown | LC | Steady | | |
| Japanese buzzard (Eastern buzzard) | Buteo japonicus | unknown | LC | ? | | |
| Himalayan buzzard | Buteo refectus | unknown | LC | ? | | |
| Greater yellow-headed vulture | Cathartes melambrotus | unknown | LC | ▼ | | |
| Black-chested snake-eagle | Circaetus pectoralis | unknown | LC | Steady | Total population "may exceed five figures." Very little data available on population size. | |
| Spotted harrier | Circus assimilis | unknown | LC | Steady | | |
| Long-winged harrier | Circus buffoni | unknown | LC | ▼ | | |
| Cinereous harrier | Circus cinereus | unknown | LC | ▼ | | |
| African marsh-harrier | Circus ranivorus | unknown | LC | ▼ | | |
| Papuan harrier | Circus spilothorax | unknown | LC | Steady | | |
| Congo serpent-eagle | Dryotriorchis spectabilis | unknown | LC | ▼ | | |
| Black-winged kite | Elanus caeruleus | unknown | LC | Steady | European population is estimated to be 2,200-5,300 mature individuals. | |
| Black-chested buzzard-eagle | Geranoaetus melanoleucus | unknown | LC | Steady | | |
| Variable hawk | Geranoaetus polyosoma | unknown | LC | Steady | | |
| Whistling kite | Haliastur sphenurus | unknown | LC | Steady | | |
| Black-breasted buzzard | Hamirostra melanosternon | unknown | LC | ▼ | Population was previously estimated at 1,000-10,000 individuals; IUCN reports there are too few data to support any present guesses. | |
| Rufous-thighed kite | Harpagus diodon | unknown | LC | ▼ | | |
| Long-tailed honey-buzzard | Henicopernis longicauda | unknown | LC | ▼ | | |
| Pygmy eagle | Hieraaetus weiskei | unknown | LC | ▼ | | |
| African fish-eagle | Ichthyophaga vocifer | unknown | LC | Steady | IUCN assessment still places bird in genus Haliaeetus. | |
| Lizard buzzard | Kaupifalco monogrammicus | unknown | LC | Steady | | |
| White-browed hawk | Leucopternis kuhli | unknown | LC | ▼ | | |
| Black-faced hawk | Leucopternis melanops | unknown | LC | ▼ | | |
| Square-tailed kite | Lophoictinia isura | unknown | LC | ▼ | | |
| Sulawesi goshawk | Lophospiza griseiceps | unknown | LC | ▼ | IUCN assessment still places bird in genus Accipiter. | |
| Bat hawk | Macheiramphus alcinus | unknown | LC | ▼ | | |
| Doria's goshawk (Doria's hawk) | Megatriorchis doriae | unknown | LC | ▼ | | |
| Pale chanting-goshawk | Melierax canorus | unknown | LC | Steady | | |
| Eastern chanting-goshawk | Melierax poliopterus | unknown | LC | Steady | | |
| Gabar goshawk | Micronisius gabar | unknown | LC | Steady | | |
| Yellow-billed kite | Milvus aegyptus | unknown | LC | ▼ | | |
| Blyth's hawk-eagle | Nisaetus alboniger | unknown | LC | ▼ | | |
| Changeable hawk-eagle | Nisaetus cirrhatus | unknown | LC | ▼ | | |
| Sulawesi hawk-eagle | Nisaetus lanceolatus | unknown | LC | ▼ | | |
| White-rumped hawk | Parabuteo leucorrhous | unknown | LC | ▼ | | |
| Sulawesi honey-buzzard (Barred honey buzzard) | Pernis celebensis | unknown | LC | ▼ | | Roofvogel op een uitzichtpunt langs de weg van Makassar naar Singkang, KITLV 159965 |
| Philippine honey-buzzard | Pernis steerei | unknown | LC | ▼ | | |
| Madagascar harrier-hawk | Polyboroides radiatus | unknown | LC | ▼ | | |
| King vulture | Sarcoramphus papa | unknown | LC | ▼ | | |
| Crested serpent-eagle | Spilornis cheela | unknown | LC | ▼ | | |
| Philippine serpent-eagle | Spilornis holospilus | unknown | LC | ▼ | | |
| Sulawesi serpent-eagle | Spilornis rufipectus | unknown | LC | ▼ | | |
| Pied goshawk | Tachyspiza albogularis | unknown | LC | Steady | Population was previously estimated at 1,000-10,000 individuals; IUCN reports there are too few data to support any present guesses. IUCN assessment still places bird in genus Accipiter. | |
| Collared sparrowhawk | Tachyspiza cirrocephala | unknown | LC | Steady | IUCN assessment gives binomial name as Accipiter cirrocephalus. | |
| Brown goshawk | Tachyspiza fasciata | unknown | LC | ▼ | IUCN assessment still places bird in genus Accipiter. | |
| Rufous-necked sparrowhawk | Tachyspiza erythrauchen | unknown | LC | ▼ | IUCN assessment still places bird in genus Accipiter. | |
| Red-legged sparrowhawk (Red-thighed sparrowhawk) | Tachyspiza erythropus | unknown | LC | ▼ | IUCN assessment still places bird in genus Accipiter. | |
| Black-mantled goshawk | Tachyspiza melanochlamys | unknown | LC | Steady | Population was previously estimated at 1,000-10,000 individuals; IUCN reports there are no data to support any present guesses. IUCN assessment still places bird in genus Accipiter. | Astur_melanochlamys_-_The_Birds_of_New_Guinea_(cropped) |
| Dwarf sparrowhawk (Small sparrowhawk) | Tachyspiza nanus | unknown | LC | Steady | IUCN assessment still places bird in genus Accipiter. | |
| Vinous-breasted sparrowhawk | Tachyspiza rhodogaster | unknown | LC | ▼ | IUCN assessment still places bird in genus Accipiter. | |
| Fiji goshawk | Tachyspiza rufitorques | unknown | LC | ▼ | IUCN assessment still places bird in genus Accipiter. | |
| Spot-tailed goshawk (Spot-tailed sparrowhawk) | Tachyspiza trinotata | unknown | LC | ▼ | IUCN assessment gives binomial name as Accipiter trinotatus. | |
| Long-tailed hawk | Urotriorchis macrourus | unknown | LC | ▼ | | |

== See also ==
- Lists of birds by population
- Lists of organisms by population
