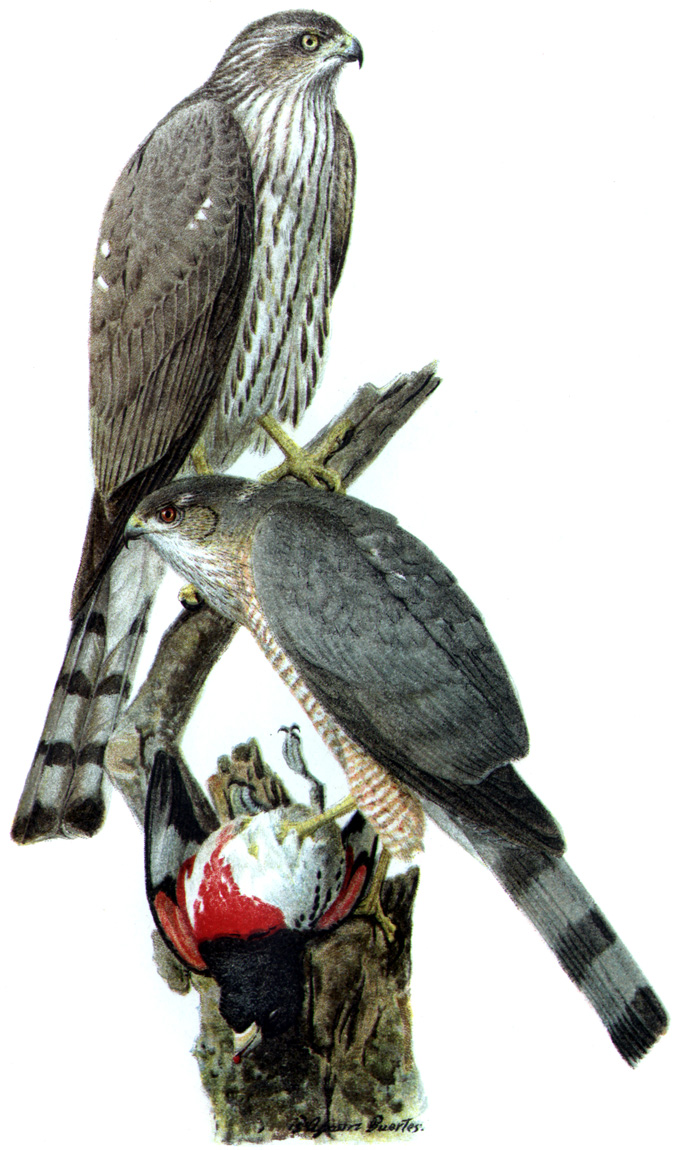
- Sharp-shinned hawk

Scientific classification
- Kingdom: Animalia
- Phylum: Chordata
- Class: Aves
- Order: Accipitriformes
- Family: Accipitridae
- Subfamily: Accipitrinae

Genera
- 11 genera. See below.

= Accipitrinae =

True hawks

Subfamily of birds

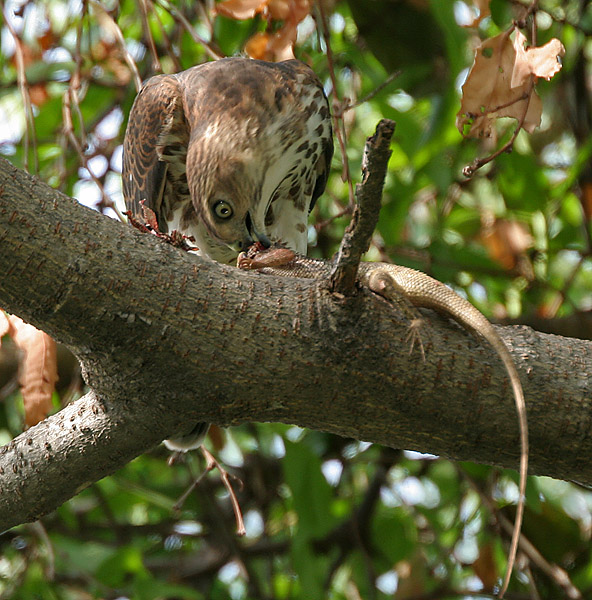
Shikra Accipiter badius feeding on a garden lizard in Hyderabad, India.

The Accipitrinae are the subfamily of the Accipitridae often known as the "true" hawks. The subfamily contains 73 species that are divided into 11 genera. It includes the genus Accipiter which formerly included many more species. The large genus was found to be non-monophyletic and was split into several new or resurrected genera. The birds in this subfamily are primarily woodland birds that hunt by sudden dashes from a concealed perch, with long tails, broad wings and high visual acuity facilitating this lifestyle.

Hawks, including the accipitrines, are believed to have vision several times sharper than humans, in part because of the great number of photoreceptor cells in their retinas (up to 1,000,000 per square mm, against 200,000 for humans), a very high number of nerves connecting the receptors to the brain, and an indented fovea, which magnifies the central portion of the visual field. Eagles, such as the bald eagle in the family Buteoninae, are also included in this family.

A series of molecular phylogenetic studies found that the genus Accipiter was non-monophyletic. The results of a densely sampled 2024 study of the Accipitridae allowed the generic boundaries to be redefined. To create monophyletic genera, species were moved from Accipiter to five new or resurrected genera leaving only 9 species in Accipiter. The southeast Asian crested goshawk and the Sulawesi goshawk were found to be only distantly related to other species in Accipiter. They were moved to a resurrected genus Lophospiza, the only genus placed in the new subfamily Lophospizinae. Similarly, the very small south America tiny hawk and semicollared hawk were found to be only distantly related to species in Accipiter. They were moved to a newly erected genus Microspizias which together with Harpagus is placed in the subfamily Harpaginae. The genera Circus, Megatriorchis, and Erythrotriorchis were found to be nested within Accipiter. Rather than subsuming these genera into an expanded Accipiter, species were moved from Accipiter to the resurrected genera Aerospiza, Tachyspiza and Astur.

The genus level cladogram of the Accipitrinae shown below is based on a molecular phylogenetic study of the Accipitridae by Therese Catanach and collaborators that was published in 2024. The number of species in each genus is based on the list maintained by Frank Gill, Pamela C. Rasmussen and David Donsker on behalf of the International Ornithological Committee (IOC).

- Accipitrinae
  - - Micronisus – gabar goshawk
    - - Urotriorchis – long-tailed hawk
      - Melierax – chanting goshawks (3 species)
  - - Kaupifalco – lizard buzzard
    - - - Aerospiza – sparrowhawk, goshawks (3 species, formerly in Accipiter)
        - Tachyspiza – goshawks, sparrowhawks (27 species, formerly in Accipiter)
      - - Erythrotriorchis – goshawks (2 species)
        - - Accipiter – hawks, sparrowhawks (9 species)
          - - Astur – hawks, sparrowhawk, goshawks (9 species, formerly in Accipiter)
            - - Megatriorchis – Doria's hawk
              - Circus – harriers (16 species)

== Species ==
The subfamily Accipitrinae contains 73 species that are arranged into 11 genera:

Image	Genus	Living species
	Micronisus G.R. Gray, 1840	Gabar goshawk, Micronisus gabar
	Urotriorchis Sharpe, 1874	Long-tailed hawk, Urotriorchis macrourus
	Melierax G.R. Gray, 1840	Dark chanting goshawk, Melierax metabates; Eastern chanting goshawk, Melierax poliopterus; Pale chanting goshawk, Melierax canorus
	Kaupifalco Bonaparte, 1854	Lizard buzzard, Kaupifalco monogrammicus
	Aerospiza Roberts, 1922	Red-chested goshawk, Aerospiza toussenelii; African goshawk, Aerospiza tachiro; Chestnut-flanked sparrowhawk, Aerospiza castanilius
	Tachyspiza Kaup, 1844	Shikra, Tachyspiza badia; Nicobar sparrowhawk, Tachyspiza butleri; Levant sparrowhawk, Tachyspiza brevipes; Chinese sparrowhawk, Tachyspiza soloensis; Frances's sparrowhawk, Tachyspiza francesiae; Spot-tailed sparrowhawk, Tachyspiza trinotata; Grey goshawk, Tachyspiza novaehollandiae; Variable goshawk, Tachyspiza hiogaster; Brown goshawk, Tachyspiza fasciata; Black-mantled goshawk, Tachyspiza melanochlamys; Pied goshawk, Tachyspiza albogularis; White-bellied goshawk, Tachyspiza haplochroa; Fiji goshawk, Tachyspiza rufitorques; Moluccan goshawk, Tachyspiza henicogramma; Slaty-mantled goshawk, Tachyspiza luteoschistacea; Imitator goshawk, Tachyspiza imitator; Grey-headed goshawk, Tachyspiza poliocephala; New Britain goshawk, Tachyspiza princeps; Red-thighed sparrowhawk, Tachyspiza erythropus; Little sparrowhawk, Tachyspiza minulla; Japanese sparrowhawk, Tachyspiza gularis; Besra, Tachyspiza virgata; Dwarf sparrowhawk, Tachyspiza nanus; Rufous-necked sparrowhawk, Tachyspiza erythrauchen; Collared sparrowhawk, Tachyspiza cirrocephala; New Britain sparrowhawk, Tachyspiza brachyura; Vinous-breasted sparrowhawk, Tachyspiza rhodogaster
	Erythrotriorchis Sharpe, 1875	Chestnut-shouldered goshawk, Erythrotriorchis buergersi; Red goshawk, Erythrotriorchis radiatus
	Accipiter Brisson, 1760	Madagascar sparrowhawk, Accipiter madagascariensis; Ovambo sparrowhawk, Accipiter ovampensis; Eurasian sparrowhawk, Accipiter nisus; Rufous-breasted sparrowhawk, Accipiter rufiventris; Grey-bellied hawk, Accipiter poliogaster; Sharp-shinned hawk, Accipiter striatus; White-breasted hawk, Accipiter chionogaster; Plain-breasted hawk, Accipiter ventralis; Rufous-thighed hawk, Accipiter erythronemius
	Astur Lacépède, 1799	Cooper's hawk, Astur cooperii; Gundlach's hawk, Astur gundlachi; Bicolored hawk, Astur bicolor; Chilean hawk, Astur chilensis; Black sparrowhawk, Astur melanoleucus; Henst's goshawk, Astur henstii; Eurasian goshawk, Astur gentilis; American goshawk, Astur atricapillus; Meyer's goshawk, Astur meyerianus
	Megatriorchis Salvadori & D'Albertis, 1875	Doria's hawk, Megatriorchis doriae
	Circus Lacépède, 1799	Western marsh harrier, Circus aeruginosus; Eastern marsh harrier, Circus spilonotus; Papuan harrier, Circus spilothorax; Swamp harrier, Circus approximans; African marsh harrier, Circus ranivorus; Réunion harrier, Circus maillardi; Malagasy harrier, Circus macrosceles; Long-winged harrier, Circus buffoni; Spotted harrier, Circus assimilis; Black harrier, Circus maurus; Hen harrier, Circus cyaneus; Northern harrier, Circus hudsonius; Cinereous harrier, Circus cinereus; Pallid harrier, Circus macrourus; Pied harrier, Circus melanoleucos; Montagu's harrier, Circus pygargus

== Hawks and humans ==
Hawks are sometimes used in falconry, a sport in which trained birds of prey are flown at small game for sport.
