= U. macrourus =

U. macrourus may refer to:

- Urocolius macrourus, the blue-naped mousebird, a bird species
- Urotriorchis macrourus, the long-tailed hawk, a bird of prey species

== See also ==
- Macourus
