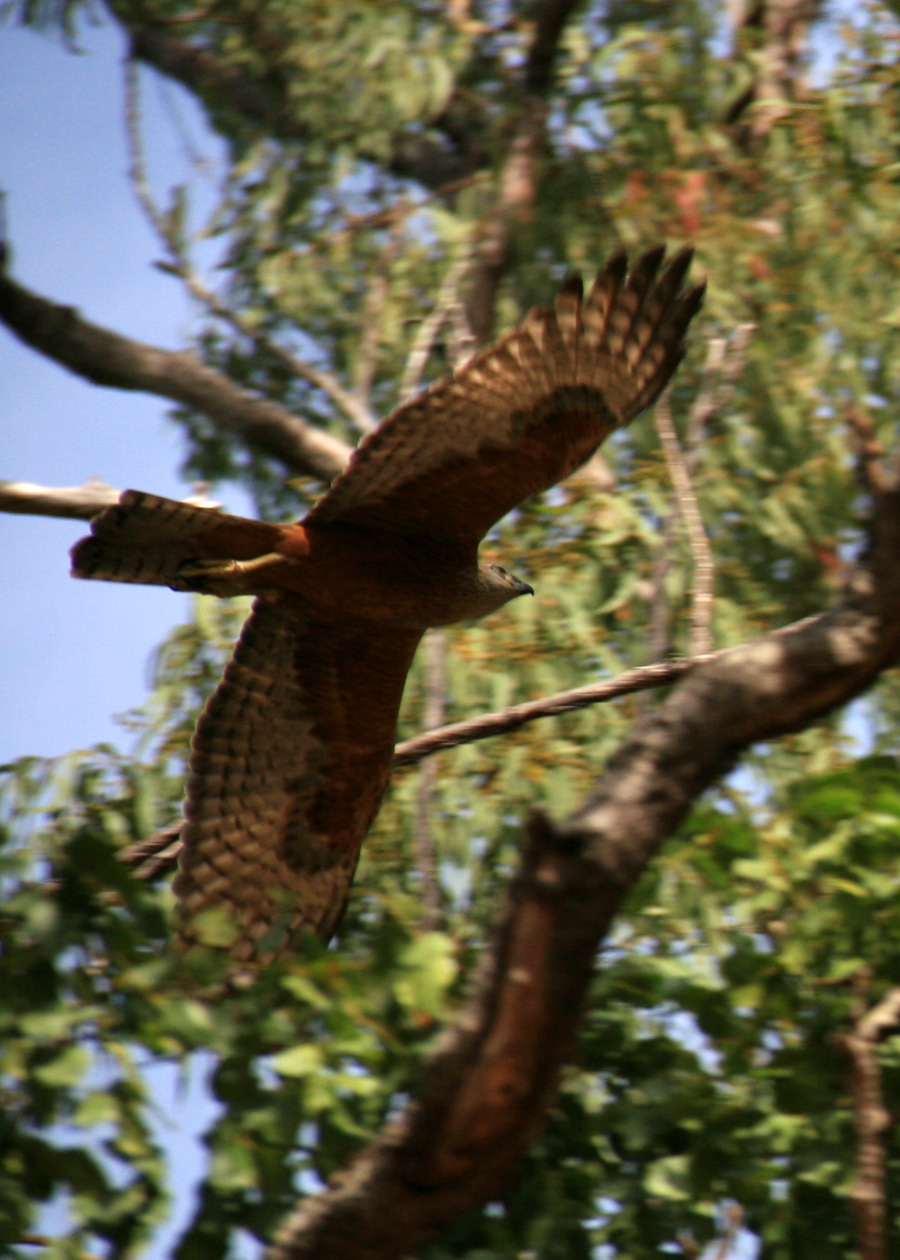
- A male Red Goshawk (Erythrotriorchis radiatus) in flight

Scientific classification
- Kingdom: Animalia
- Phylum: Chordata
- Class: Aves
- Order: Accipitriformes
- Family: Accipitridae
- Subfamily: Accipitrinae
- Genus: Erythrotriorchis; Sharpe, 1875

Type species
- Falco radiatus Latham, 1801

= Erythrotriorchis =

Genus of birds

Erythrotriorchis is a genus of bird of prey in the family Accipitridae.

== Species ==
It contains the following species:

Genus Erythrotriorchis – Sharpe, 1875 – two species
Common name	Scientific name and subspecies	Range	Size and ecology	IUCN status and estimated population
Chestnut-shouldered goshawk	Erythrotriorchis buergersi (Reichenow, 1914)	New Guinea.	Size: Habitat: Diet:	DD
Red goshawk	Erythrotriorchis radiatus (Latham, 1801)	Far North Queensland, Kakadu Savanna and the Tiwi Islands in the Northern Territory, and Mornington Sanctuary in the Kimberley region of Western Australia	Size: Habitat: Diet:	EN

== Etymology ==
"Erythro-" is from a Greek word for "red", and "triorchis" meant a kind of hawk thought to have three testicles. For further details see Eutriorchis.

== Taxonomy ==
Latham described the red goshawk as Falco radiatus in 1801. Sharpe defined Erythrotriorchis in 1875 as a new monotypic genus for Falco radiatus.

Peters also included E. doriae in the genus, though Doria's goshawk is now classified separately as Megatriorchis doriae.
