= Lilyvale Important Bird Area =

Coordinates: 14°32′58″S 143°40′35″E

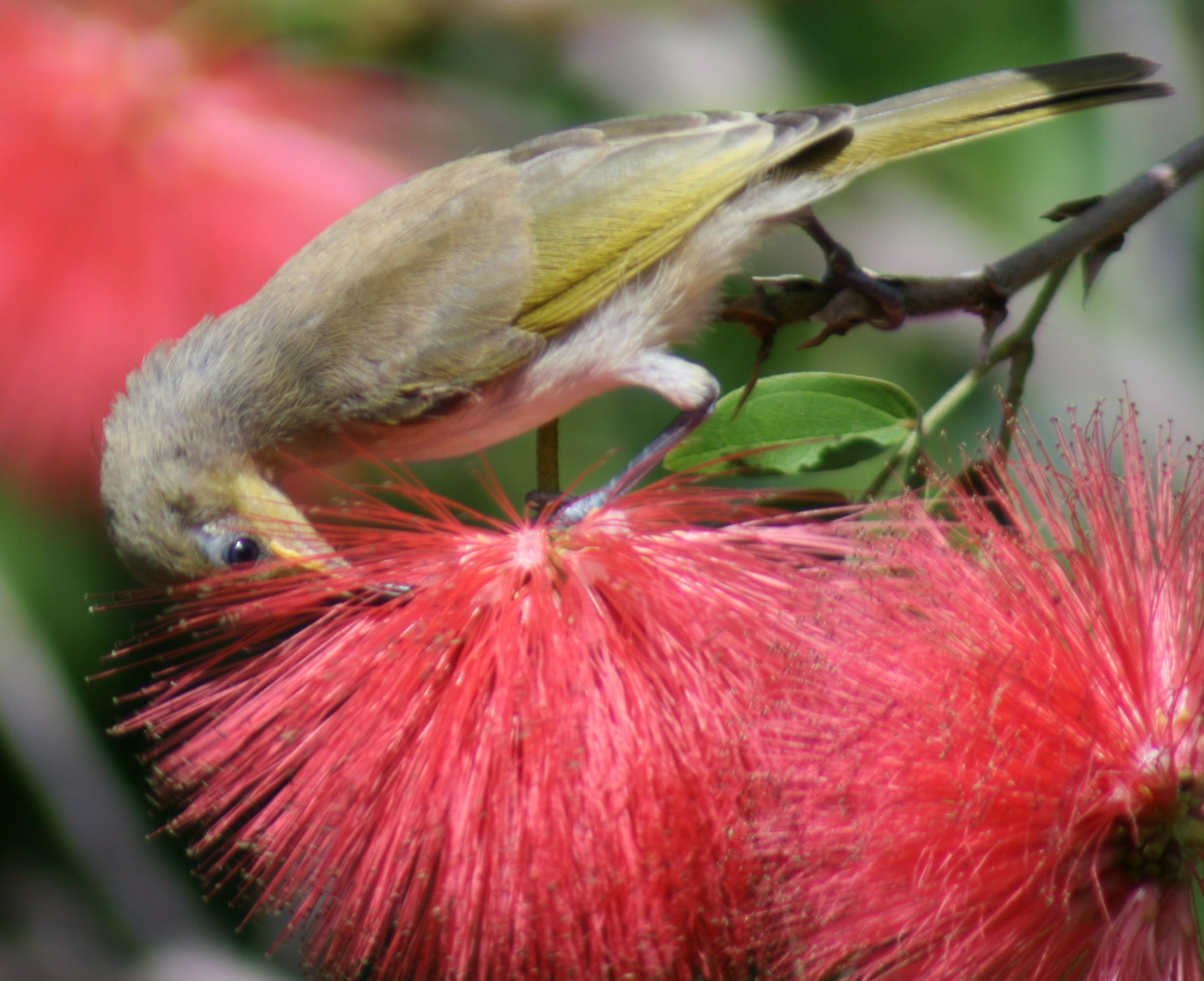
Lilyvale is an important area for yellow honeyeaters

Lilyvale Important Bird Area is a 35 km^{2} tract of land on the south-eastern Cape York Peninsula in Far North Queensland, Australia, that is important for bird conservation, and especially for red goshawks.

== Description ==
The IBA consists of tall eucalypt woodland on colluvial sandy soils that provide good habitat for the vulnerable red goshawk. It comprises all such habitat on a former pastoral lease, Lilyvale Station, which is now managed by the Queensland Parks and Wildlife Service. The IBA has a tropical monsoonal climate, with most rainfall occurring in the summer wet season from December to April, succeeded by a long dry season when fires are frequent.

== Birds ==
Lilyvale has been identified by BirdLife International as an Important Bird Area (IBA) because it supports an unusually high population density of red goshawks, as well as four of the 17 species confined to the tropical savanna biome in Queensland, the yellow, yellow-tinted and bar-breasted honeyeaters, and the silver-crowned friarbird. It also supports other tropical woodland species such as the black-backed butcherbird and black-chinned honeyeater. The black-throated finch has been recorded from the IBA.
