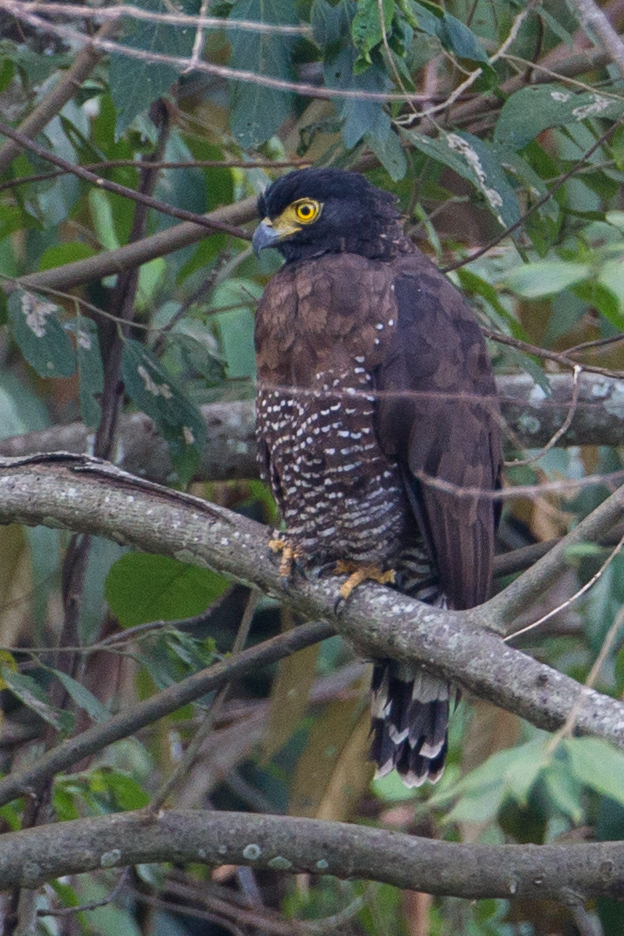
- adult
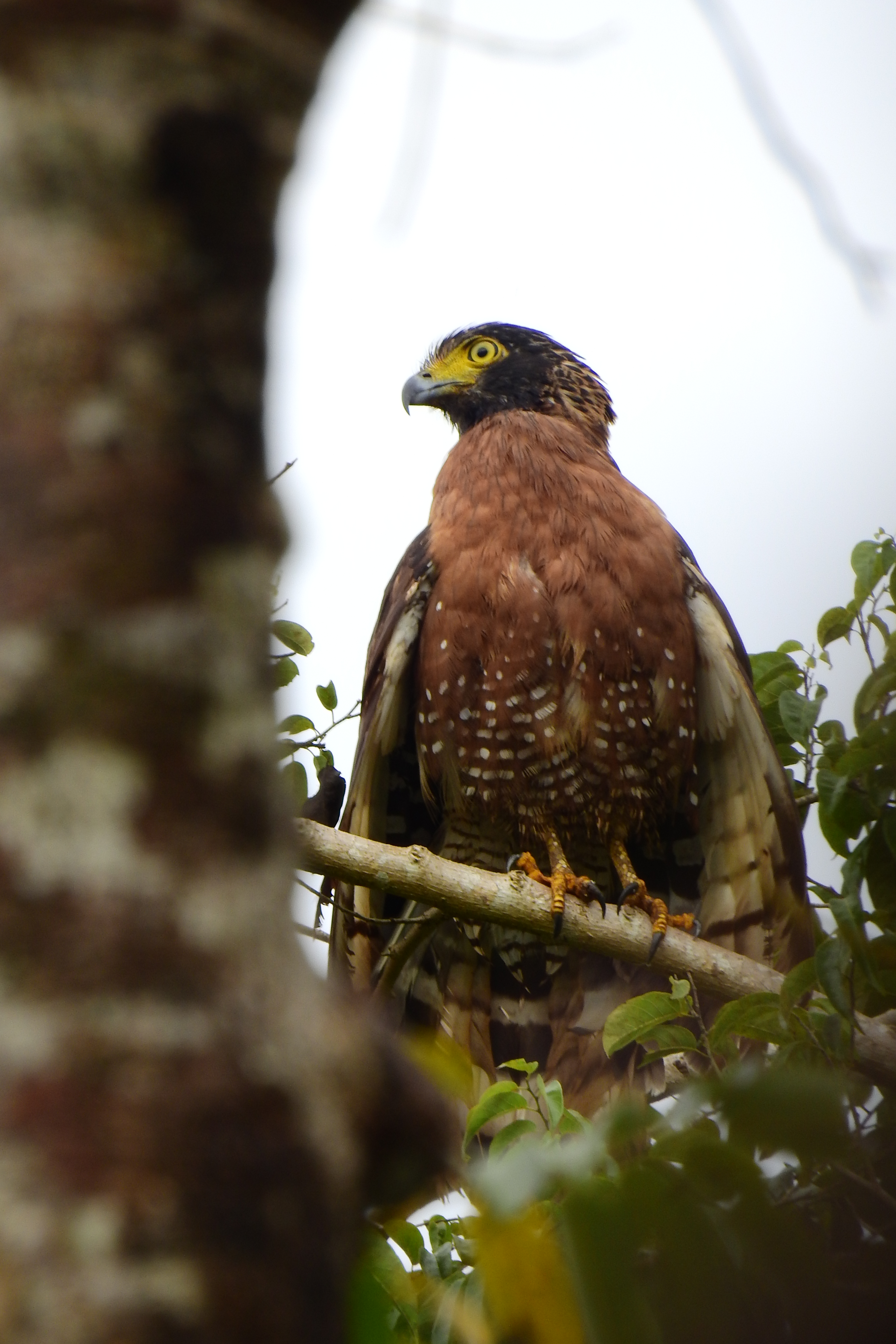
- immature

Conservation status
- Least Concern (IUCN 3.1)

Scientific classification
- Kingdom: Animalia
- Phylum: Chordata
- Class: Aves
- Order: Accipitriformes
- Family: Accipitridae
- Genus: Spilornis
- Species: S. rufipectus

Binomial name
- Spilornis rufipectus Gould, 1858

Subspecies
- S. r. rufipectus - Gould, 1858; S. r. sulaensis - (Schlegel, 1866)

= Sulawesi serpent eagle =

Species of bird

The Sulawesi serpent eagle (Spilornis rufipectus) is a species of bird of prey in the family Accipitridae. It is endemic to Sulawesi in Indonesia. Its natural habitat is subtropical or tropical moist lowland forest. It measures 46-54 cm long and has a wingspan of 105-120 cm.
