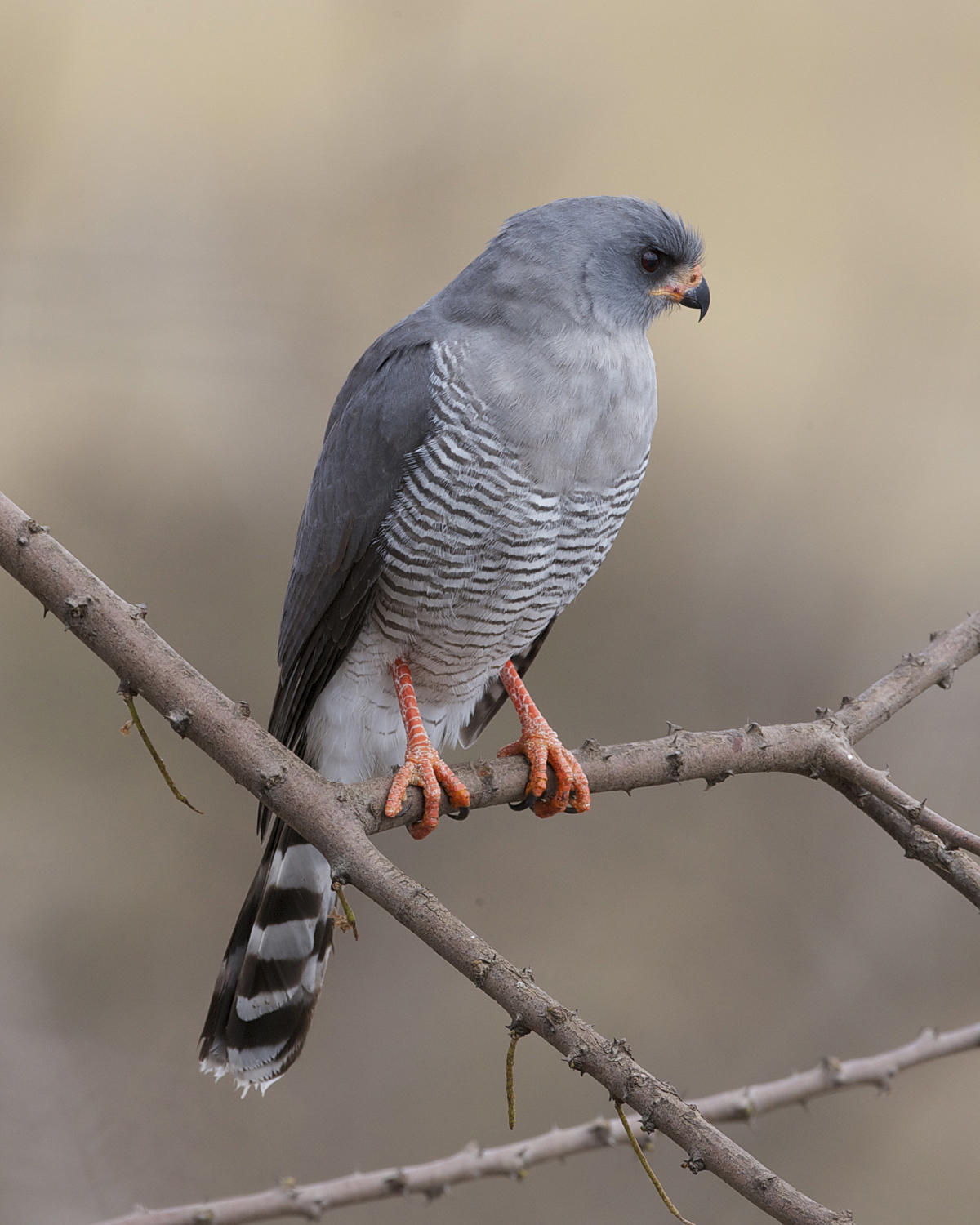
- Adult in Tanzania

Conservation status
- Least Concern (IUCN 3.1)

Scientific classification
- Kingdom: Animalia
- Phylum: Chordata
- Class: Aves
- Order: Accipitriformes
- Family: Accipitridae
- Subfamily: Accipitrinae
- Genus: Micronisus; G.R. Gray, 1840
- Species: M. gabar

Binomial name
- Micronisus gabar (Daudin, 1800)

Subspecies
- M. g. niger - (Vieillot, 1823); M. g. aequatorius - Clancey, 1987; M. g. gabar - (Daudin, 1800)

Synonyms
- Melierax gabar Daudin, 1800

= Gabar goshawk =

Species of bird

The gabar goshawk (Micronisus gabar) is a small species of African and Arabian bird of prey in the family Accipitridae.

== Description ==
The gabar goshawk is polymorphic and occurs in two distinct forms which fluctuate in relative abundance across the geographic range of the species. The more frequent, paler form has mostly grey upperparts with a conspicuous, white rump and white and grey barring on the chest, thighs and underwings, and a dark grey, barred tail. In contrast, the less frequent form, which accounts on average for approximately 25 percent of the overall population, is almost completely black. In both forms of adult the eyes are dark, and the legs are long and the cere is red. The cere and the legs are yellow in immatures and the plumage is generally browner, with the pale birds having untidier barring on the chest than the adult. The females are significantly larger than the males, the male's weigh 90 – 173g and the females 167 – 240g. The body length is 28–36 cm and the wingspan 63 cm.

== Distribution and subspecies ==
The gabar goshawk is found in sub-Saharan Africa, extending to Arabian Peninsula. These subspecies are currently recognised:

- M. g. aequatorius: highlands of Ethiopia to the Democratic Republic of the Congo, Zambia, and northern Mozambique
- M. g. gabar: southern Angola to Zambia, Mozambique, and South Africa
- M. g. niger: Senegambia to Sudan, northern Ethiopia and southwestern Arabia

== Habitat ==
The gabar goshawk occurs in open woodland, especially dry Acacia savanna and broad-leaved woodland, with miombo (Brachystegia), cluster-leaf Terminalia, and mopane (Colosphermum mopane). In the more arid regions of southern Africa such as the Karoo and Namib Desert, it is generally restricted to tree-lined watercourses, but it may also move into cities and towns.

== Biology ==
The gabar goshawk is usually considered to be sedentary, but immature birds are somewhat nomadic and some small migratory movements have been recorded in parts of its range. It is most frequently observed alone, but pairs are also common, particularly during the breeding season, when the male is often observed pursuing the female through trees, or calling from his perch. The small platform nest is typically constructed using thin twigs and positioned in a vertical fork in the crown of a thorny tree, such as an acacia. One notable aspect of their nest construction is that the birds collect spider webs including the live spiders, the spiders spin new webs which may help camouflage the nest, and the spiders may consume arthropods that would parasitize the chicks.

The eggs are laid from July to December, peaking in September to November. The normal clutch is two eggs, but up to four may be laid, and these are mainly incubated by the female for about 33–38 days. Once hatched, the chicks are brooded by the female for the first 19–21 days of their lives, while the male brings her food to feed to them. They leave the nest around 35–36 days old, becoming fully independent about one month later.

Small birds are the major part of the gabar goshawk's diet, with small mammals, reptiles, and insects also taken on occasion. The prey is typically flushed from trees and caught following a persistent and energetic pursuit. The gabar goshawk sometimes hunts from the perch, swooping down to catch prey off the ground or in flight. They have also been recorded attacking the nests of colonial birds such as weavers by clawing their way destructively through the nest top to snatch the chicks from the nest.

Known predators of the gabar goshawk include tawny eagles, Wahlberg's eagles, and Ayres's hawk-eagles.
