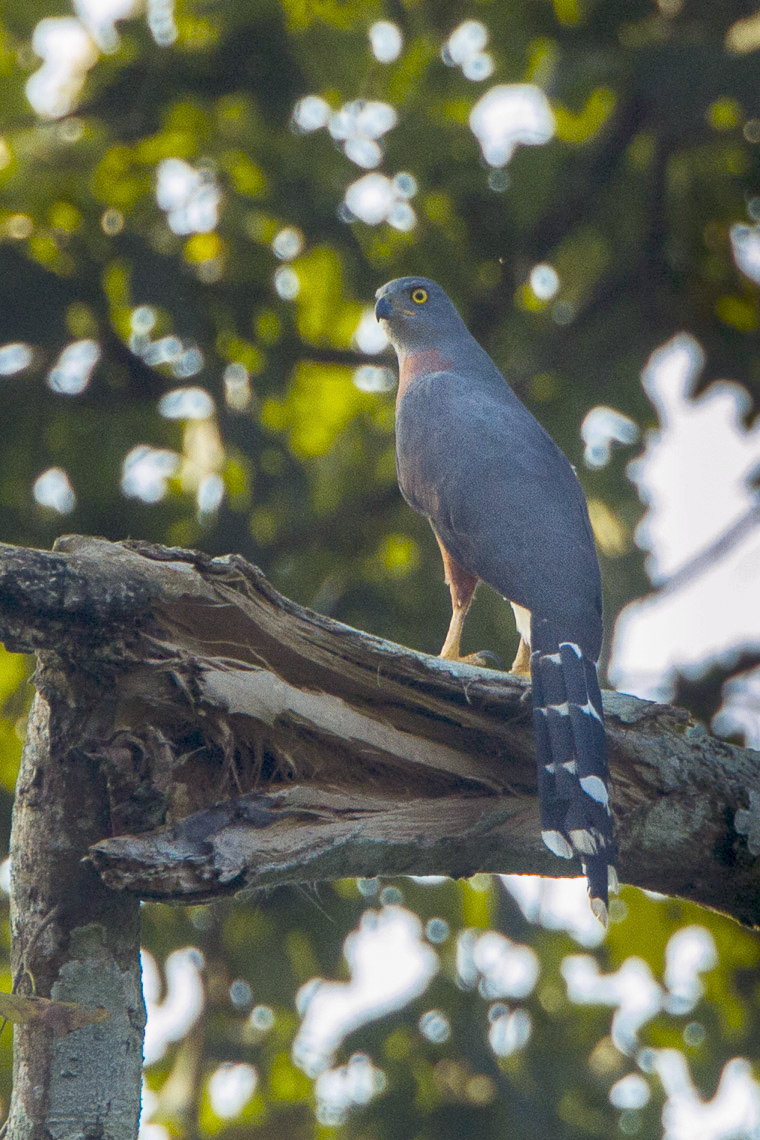

Conservation status
- Least Concern (IUCN 3.1)

Scientific classification
- Kingdom: Animalia
- Phylum: Chordata
- Class: Aves
- Order: Accipitriformes
- Family: Accipitridae
- Subfamily: Accipitrinae
- Genus: Urotriorchis; Sharpe, 1874
- Species: U. macrourus

Binomial name
- Urotriorchis macrourus (Hartlaub, 1855)

= Long-tailed hawk =

Species of bird

The long-tailed hawk (Urotriorchis macrourus) is an African bird of prey in the family Accipitridae. It is the only member of the genus Urotriorchis.

== Description ==
The long-tailed hawk is a distinctively shaped raptor with a very noticeable long, barred tail and is dark grey on its upperparts and chestnut on its underparts with a contrasting white throat and undertail coverts. In flight the white flight feathers on the underwing are heavily barred with dark grey. There is a rare morph which has a grey breast, with a paler grey throat but still has the white undertail coverts. The bill is black, the eyes, cere, legs and feet are yellow. Juveniles are browner, with a white-breasted "plain" morph and a "marked" morph which has the breast streaked with brown. It has a wingspan of 81–90 centimetres (32–35 in) and a total length of 56–65 centimetres (22–26 in), including the tail of 30–37 centimetres (12–15 in). Females are about 15% larger than males. Since the tail comprises about 56% of this raptor's total length, this species ties with the cinereous harrier as the raptor with the longest tail relative to its body size.

=== Voice ===
It is a rather vocal bird which is often first detected by the long drawn out screech given by birds perched in the canopy.

== Distribution and habitat ==
The long-tailed hawk occurs in the tropical rainforests of western and central Africa, from Guinea in the west, along the Gulf of Guinea coast south to northern Angola, east to the southern Central African Republic, northern Democratic Republic of Congo, South Sudan and western Uganda.

== Habits ==
The long-tailed hawk primarily eats squirrels, especially scaly-tailed squirrels, and small birds; it can also hunt chickens in the villages close to the forest. It kills prey by breaking the neck. It has also been known to attack hammer-headed fruit bats. Its strong legs and feet suggest its main prey are mammals. The mating season occurs in July and August, when the pair build a nest on a high tree. Little is known regarding nesting and breeding the young, an adult was seen feeding a fledged juvenile in Sierra Leone in August.

== Etymology ==
The generic name Urotriorchis was coined by Richard Bowdler Sharpe in 1874 and combines "Uro-", from the Greek "tail", and "triorchis", a kind of hawk thought to have three testicles—for further details see Eutriorchis. "Macro-" is from the Greek for "long", so macrourus means "long-tailed", as in the English name.
