= Chestnut-shouldered goshawk =

Conservation status
- Near Threatened (IUCN 3.1)

Scientific classification
- Kingdom: Animalia
- Phylum: Chordata
- Class: Aves
- Order: Accipitriformes
- Family: Accipitridae
- Genus: Erythrotriorchis
- Species: E. buergersi

Binomial name
- Erythrotriorchis buergersi (Reichenow, 1914)

Synonyms
- Astur bürgersi (protonym); Accipiter buergersi

Species of bird

The chestnut-shouldered goshawk (Erythrotriorchis buergersi) is a species of bird of prey in the family Accipitridae. It is found in New Guinea. It has a length of 43 to 53 cm and a wingspan of 85 to 109 cm.
