= New Britain goshawk =

Conservation status
- Vulnerable (IUCN 3.1)

Scientific classification
- Kingdom: Animalia
- Phylum: Chordata
- Class: Aves
- Order: Accipitriformes
- Family: Accipitridae
- Genus: Tachyspiza
- Species: T. princeps

Binomial name
- Tachyspiza princeps (Mayr, 1934)

Synonyms
- Accipiter princeps

Species of bird

The New Britain goshawk (Tachyspiza princeps) is a bird of prey species in the family Accipitridae. It is endemic to Papua New Guinea. This species was formerly placed in the genus Accipiter.

Its natural habitats are subtropical or tropical moist lowland forest and subtropical or tropical moist montane forest. It is threatened by habitat loss.

Formerly classified as Near Threatened by the IUCN, it was suspected to be rarer than previously assumed. Following the evaluation of its population status, this was found to be correct, and it is consequently uplisted to vulnerable status in 2008. The first-ever photograph of a New Britain goshawk was taken in March 2024 in the Pomio District of New Britain. In September 2025, the first recorded photographs of a juvenile of the species were taken.

== Description ==
It has a length of 38 to 45 cm and a wingspan of 75 to 86 cm.
