= New Britain sparrowhawk =

Conservation status
- Vulnerable (IUCN 3.1)

Scientific classification
- Kingdom: Animalia
- Phylum: Chordata
- Class: Aves
- Order: Accipitriformes
- Family: Accipitridae
- Genus: Tachyspiza
- Species: T. brachyura

Binomial name
- Tachyspiza brachyura (Ramsay, EP, 1880)
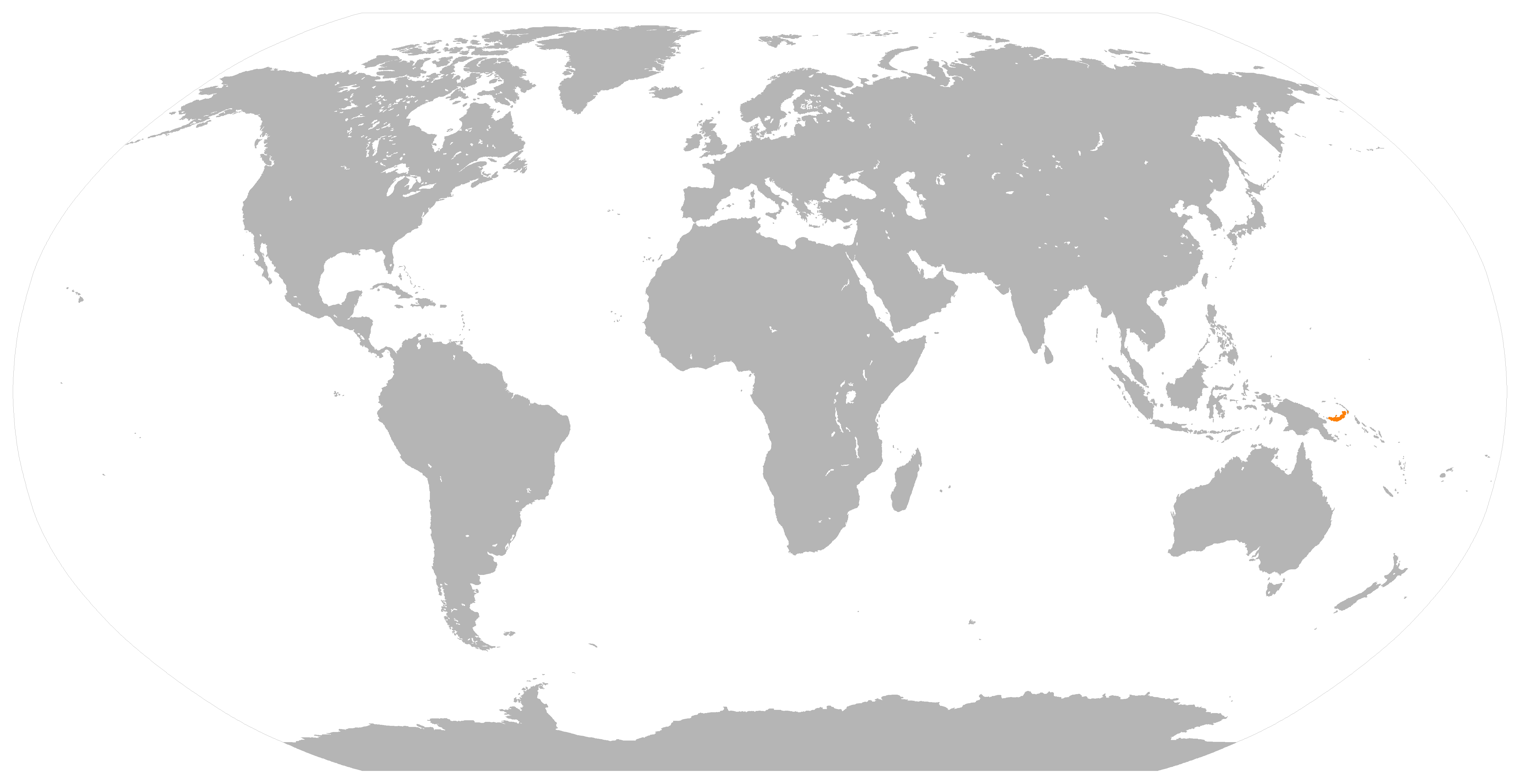

Species of bird

The New Britain sparrowhawk (Tachyspiza brachyura) is a threatened species of bird of prey. It is endemic to two Papua New Guinea islands, New Britain and New Ireland. Even in 1934 Ernst Mayr, in his survey of mountain bird life during the Whitney South Sea Expedition, found the New Britain sparrowhawk to be very rare. This species was formerly placed in the genus Accipiter.

== Description ==
These sparrowhawks are grey with a white underbelly and orange accents on the neck. They are often characterized by their large feet. They are the only hawk in New Britain or the Solomon Islands that has a middle toe that is longer than the rest. The feet of the New Britain sparrowhawks are pale yellow. These small birds only grow to be 27–34 cm long.

== Ecology ==
This species lives in tropical to subtropical, moist montane forest. The altitudes reach 1,200 to 1,800 m. New Britain sparrowhawks nest like other birds, where they raise their young. Very little is known about this species because it is so rare and the areas in which it lives have not been thoroughly studied.

== Conservation ==
it is estimated that the population is only between 1,000 and 2,499 individuals. The main threat to the continued existence of this species is habitat destruction which has led to the birds' decline in lowland forests. The clearing of forest on the small islands leaves the species with less habitat, and a far less safe environment – leading to their vulnerability. No conservation measures are known to have been taken; however it has been proposed that surveys be made to assess population size and observe nests, as well as to map the remaining forest. There are also plans to lobby for large community-based conservation areas.
