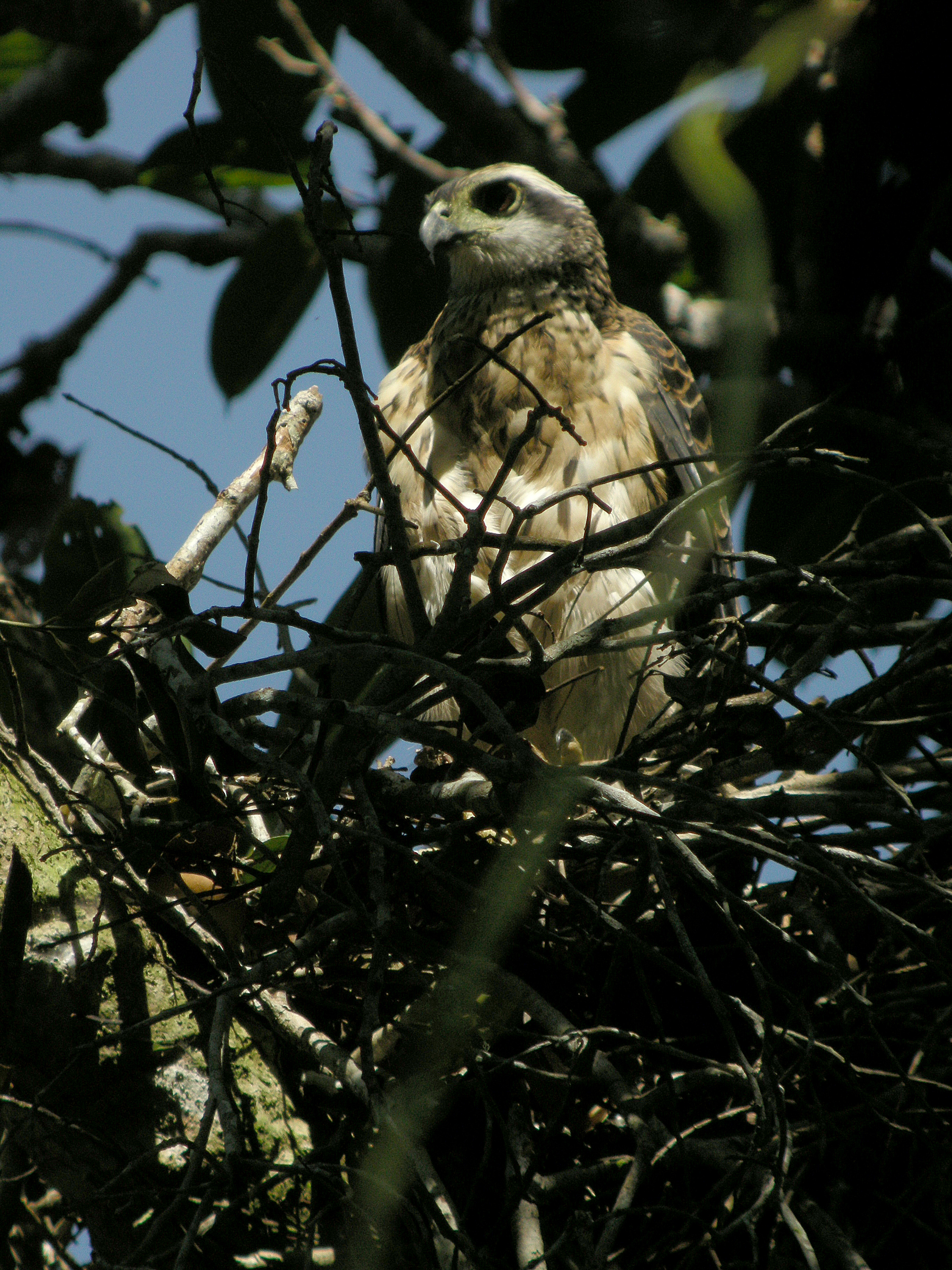

Conservation status
- Near Threatened (IUCN 3.1)

Scientific classification
- Kingdom: Animalia
- Phylum: Chordata
- Class: Aves
- Order: Accipitriformes
- Family: Accipitridae
- Subfamily: Accipitrinae
- Genus: Megatriorchis; Salvadori & D'Albertis, 1875
- Species: M. doriae

Binomial name
- Megatriorchis doriae Salvadori & D'Albertis, 1875

= Doria's hawk =

Species of bird

Doria's hawk or Doria's goshawk (Megatriorchis doriae) is a raptor in the family Accipitridae that lives in Indonesia and Papua New Guinea. It is the only species placed in the genus Megatriorchis. Within the family, it is relatively large in size, up to 69 cm long, with the female being larger in size than the male.

== Field identification ==
It is greyish-brown with a black-barred crown and upperparts, whitish underparts, a black streak behind the eye, dark brown irises, a blackish bill and greenish-yellow legs. The sexes are similar. The female is slightly larger than the male. The juvenile is a little bit lighter in color that resembles a reddish brown shade. Doria's hawk is a grayish-brown bird with a streaking pattern on its chest. The bird has the characteristics of a large, skinny hawk with a hefty bill, tiny head, strong legs, a modest crest, and wings that have a smooth, curved surface. It is not considered a typical hawk.

== Habitat ==
Doria's hawk is endemic to lowland rainforests of New Guinea and Batanta Island. This bird is rarely seen and there is little record of it because the bird is not easily noticed and does not draw attention to itself. This is partly because of its camouflage and its other habits. After being monitored for seven years observation at Tabubil, Western Province of Papua New Guinea, there was only one sighting of the bird. The bird's habitat is more specifically the New Guinea lowlands, as well as shrubs or trees that grow mainly in coastal saline or brackish water, seasonal tropical forests. Its habit is to be below forest cover or shade. The bird does not fly or rise high in the air. The bird's habitat has been decreasing as deforestation continues.

== Conservation ==
Due to ongoing habitat loss, Doria's hawk is evaluated as Near Threatened on the IUCN Red List of Threatened Species. It is listed on Appendix II of CITES. The conservation status of this species is that it is close to meeting the requirements for a threatened category in the future. The habitat of Doria's hawk was destroyed, which has a direct impact on its small and declining population.

== Etymology ==
In the genus name, "Mega-" is from the Greek word for "big". "Triorchis" was Greek for a kind of hawk thought to have three testicles — see Eutriorchis for details. The species name commemorates the Italian naturalist Giacomo Doria.

== Breeding ==
Very little is known as well about the breeding process of the species. The bird species builds large stick nests in branches and leaves of the tree.

== Movement ==
As a result of Doria's hawk being an extremely rare bird, there is not much known on the movements of the bird species. It can only be inferred that the bird species stays in one general area as a result of its small wings.

== Diet and Foraging ==
The Doria's hawk is a patient hunter that spends hours perched on the canopies waiting for prey to run by. Other than that, there is not much else known about Doria's hawk when it comes to its diet and foraging.

== Sound ==
Doria's hawk has a call that makes the sound of a long sharp hissing whistle. It makes this sound when flying, catching prey, perched up, and fighting off other birds.
