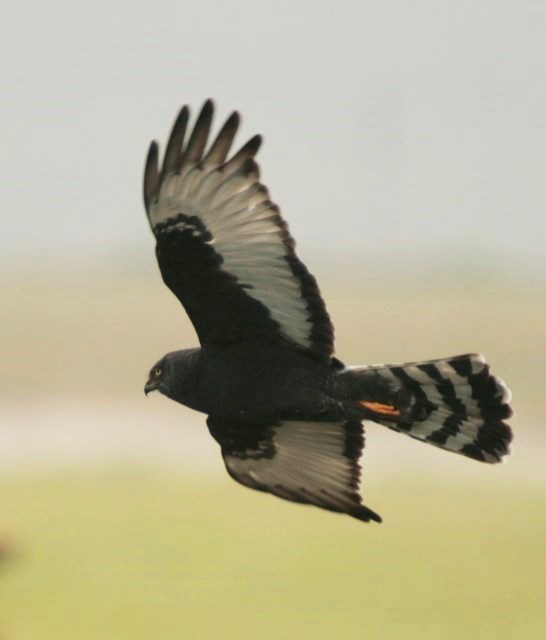

Conservation status
- Endangered (IUCN 3.1)

Scientific classification
- Kingdom: Animalia
- Phylum: Chordata
- Class: Aves
- Order: Accipitriformes
- Family: Accipitridae
- Genus: Circus
- Species: C. maurus

Binomial name
- Circus maurus (Temminck, 1828)
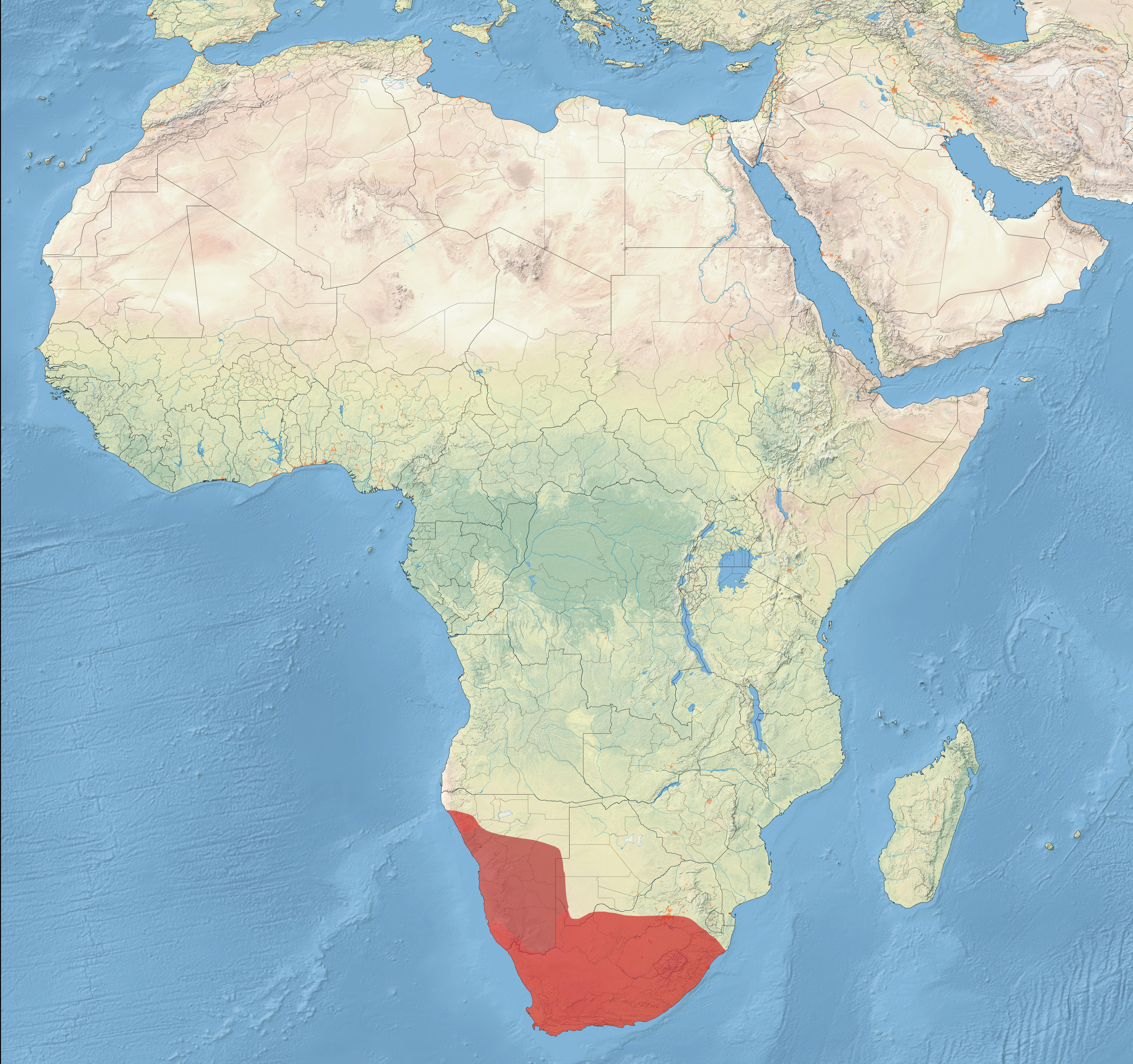
- distribution

= Black harrier =

Species of bird

The black harrier (Circus maurus) is a medium-sized African harrier whose range extends from South Africa to Botswana and Namibia. It has a wingspan of 105–115 cm (41–45 in) and a body length of 44–50 cm (17–20 in). When perched, this bird appears all black. However, in flight, a white rump and flight feathers becomes visible. Its morphology is comparable to that of other harriers, with narrow wings, a slim body, and a long tail. Male and female plumages are similar, while juveniles have buff underparts and heavily spotted breasts.

== Distribution and Migration ==
In South Africa, the distribution of the black harrier is distinctly polarised in both the Western and Southern coastal plains. Nests are concentrated either along the coastal strip or inland in a more montane habitat. Nests are generally absent from transformed and cultivated lands. There is, however, some evidence from sightings and prey remains that the black harriers do forage in these environments even if they do not breed there.

Black harriers are migratory birds and their annual movements cover the southern half of the land surface of South Africa (including Lesotho) however, there is great individual variability. The majority of these birds undertake an unusual west–east migration. They begin from their breeding areas in south-western South Africa and migrate towards the Eastern Cape, the south-west region of Kwa-Zulu Natal, the south-west region of Mpumalanga and the north-east region of Lesotho during the summer months. Pair members do not travel together and they don't use the same non-breeding areas either. It has been suggested that black harriers migrate in order to deal with food scarcity. Unusually, black harriers travel almost twice as fast during their summer post-breeding migration as during their winter/spring pre-breeding migration. In many other species, this is often reported the other way round. One reason for this is that it's part of their pre-breeding behaviour and that the extra time is used to find the best breeding areas. Home ranges during the breeding seasons and non-breeding seasons are of similar sizes, suggesting similar levels of food availability. Black harriers show some degree of fidelity to breeding areas (they return to breeding areas they have used previously) as well as natal philopatry (they return to their birthplace to breed) however, large breeding dispersal may also occur.

== Diet ==
The black harrier is a small mammal specialist which feed mostly on small rodents and birds and will occasionally take reptiles, catching them while flying low over its hunting grounds. The Four- striped Mouse, Rhabdomys pumilio, is the main prey. Regional differences in diet have also been recorded with a greater consumption of birds inland than at the coast Variation in diet is thought to be associated with local weather conditions. Early in September the diets are similar however, this then shifts with seasonal changes. Inland, during hot temperatures the proportion of small mammals in the harrier's diet declines, because the hotter temperatures reduce the activity of South African small mammals during the day. Higher temperatures may also lead to poorer environmental conditions for breeding resulting in a decreased abundance of small mammals. The breeding season of the four-striped mouse is only three months in the Karoo (where the inland black harriers are located) rather than six months as in the fynbos (where the coastal black harriers are located). In the Karoo, temperatures can reach almost 40 degrees Celsius during the day in summer. Whilst in coastal regions the proportion of small mammals in the diet increased with higher winter rainfall. This is because the winter rainfall promotes the reproduction of small mammals.

== Breeding ==
The greatest number of breeding pairs can be found in the Western Cape province, South Africa. In this area loose colonies aggregate around coastal wetlands. Breeding in Namibia is suspected but not confirmed.

Like other harriers it nests on the ground in tall vegetation. Egg laying takes place from June to November with peak laying months in July and September. Two to four eggs are laid and incubated for 35 days. In a recent study, brood size averaged 2.3 ± 1.1 (n = 61 broods) and fledged broods averaged 1.9 ± 1.2 (n = 53 broods). Egg hatchability (the proportion of viable eggs in fully incubated clutches) was 74% (n = 25 clutches), and the hatching success (the proportion of eggs that successfully become hatched young) was 63% (n = 48 clutches). A quarter of the nests were subject to nest predation both egg predation and nestling predation.

More evidence is needed but it may be that after a breeding year, black harriers take a 'Sabbatical year" in reproduction to recover from the physiological stress of breeding.

== Conservation Issues ==
=== Habitat Loss ===
The black harrier population has declined in recent years to fewer than 1000 birds, and it is now considered endangered in South Africa, Lesotho and Namibia. This is due to the destruction of its original breeding habitat, South Africa's natural shrubland, the fynbos, which has been greatly reduced by encroaching cereal culture and urban expansion as well as the invasion of alien plant species. Because of this, the black harriers have been displaced from their lowland Renosterveld and Fynbos habitats into a more montane habitat which unlike the Renosterveld and Fynbos is not characterised by foraging and nesting opportunities. The harriers in the montane environments are not as successful as those along the coastal strip which has fynbos, they breed poorly, take a wide range of prey and are subject to high levels of nest predation. Breeding at coastal sites is more successful than breeding at montane sites as they start breeding earlier, hatch larger broods and fledge more young. They are also subject to lower levels of nest predation. This land transformation has therefore negatively affected the black harriers

=== Pollutants ===
Carotenoids are pigments which are responsible for the yellow, orange and red coloration of traits such as the eye and plumages, displayed by many avian species. These play a large role in bird communication and social interactions. In nestlings these colourations likely play a role in parent off-spring communication. For example, for parents to assess nestling conditions and needs and to then adjust their care and feeding appropriately. Black harriers display carotenoid based colouration from a few days of after birth. These carotenoid pigments cannot be synthesised and need to be ingested by the harriers. Nestlings with a bird rich diet have higher levels of circulating carotenoids and display a greater carotenoud based colouration than those consuming more mammals. However, both circulating carotenoids and carotenoid based colouration have been shown to be affected by non-organic (like heavy metals) and organic (like persistent organic pollutants) contaminants. These pollutants may interfere with the communication processed that rely on carotenoid coloured traits. They may also potentially impose stress that alters nutrient requirements and use. DDT contaminated black harrier nestlings have significantly lower levels of circulating carotenoids and carotenoid-based coloration
