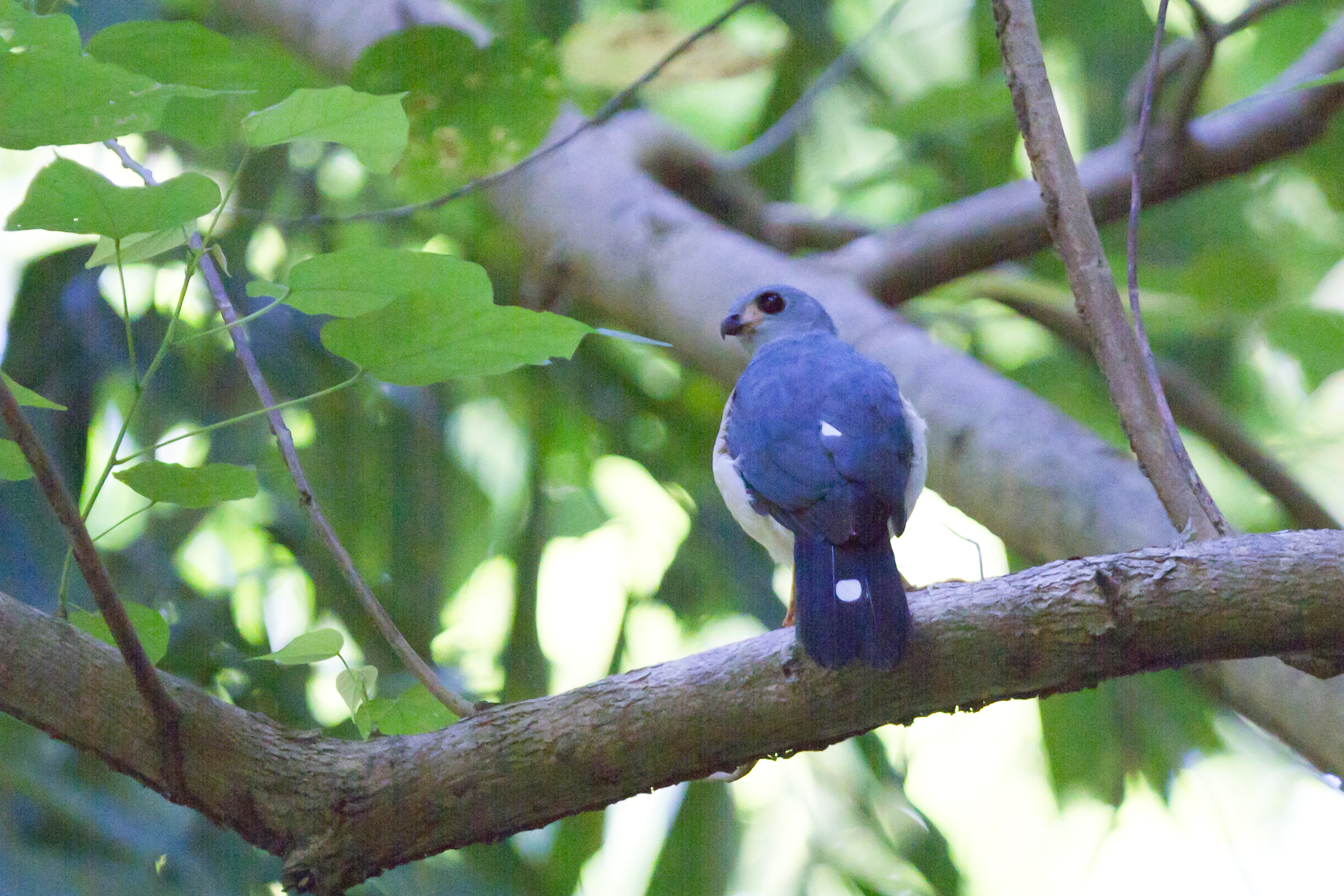

Conservation status
- Least Concern (IUCN 3.1)

Scientific classification
- Kingdom: Animalia
- Phylum: Chordata
- Class: Aves
- Order: Accipitriformes
- Family: Accipitridae
- Genus: Tachyspiza
- Species: T. trinotata

Binomial name
- Tachyspiza trinotata (Bonaparte, 1850)

= Spot-tailed sparrowhawk =

Species of bird

The spot-tailed sparrowhawk or spot-tailed goshawk (Tachyspiza trinotata) is a species of bird of prey in the family, Accipitridae. It was formerly placed in the genus Accipiter. It is endemic to Sulawesi in Indonesia. Its natural habitats are subtropical or tropical moist lowland forest and subtropical or tropical mangrove forest.

== Description ==
It has a length of 26-30 cm and a wingspan of 45-51 cm.
