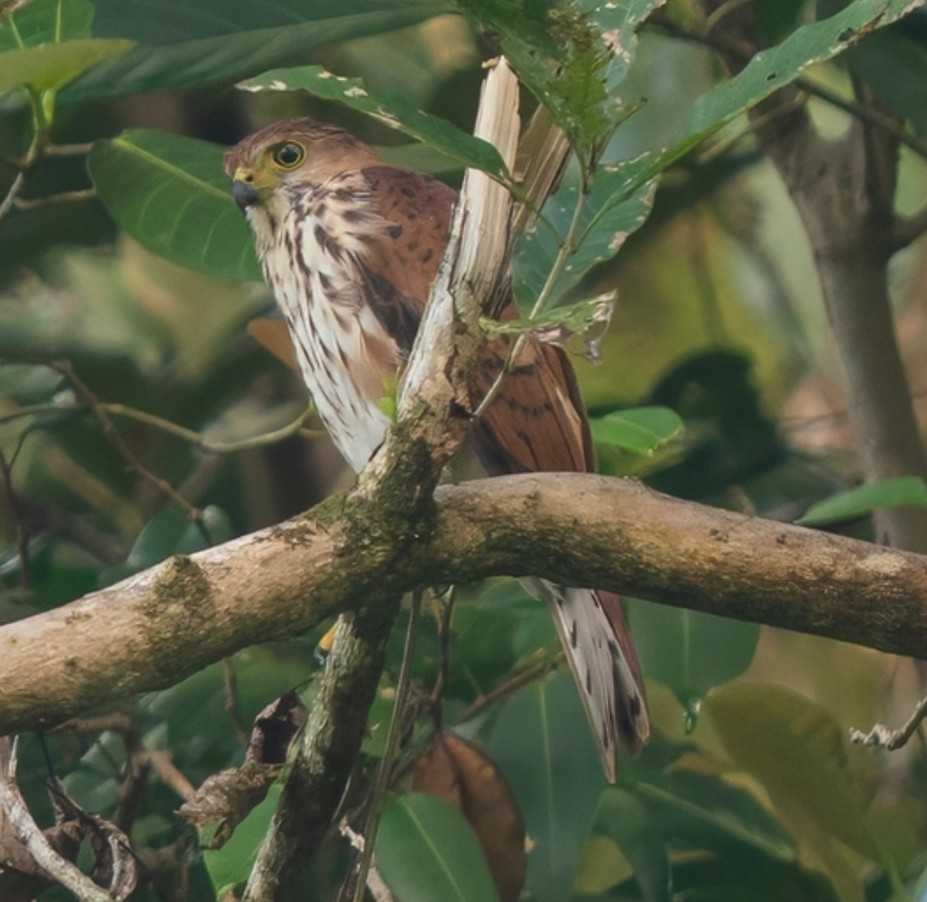

Conservation status
- Least Concern (IUCN 3.1)

Scientific classification
- Kingdom: Animalia
- Phylum: Chordata
- Class: Aves
- Order: Accipitriformes
- Family: Accipitridae
- Genus: Tachyspiza
- Species: T. rhodogaster

Binomial name
- Tachyspiza rhodogaster (Schlegel, 1862)

Subspecies
- T. r. rhodogaster - (Schlegel, 1862); T. r. sulaensis - (Schlegel, 1866)

= Vinous-breasted sparrowhawk =

Species of bird

The vinous-breasted sparrowhawk (Tachyspiza rhodogaster) is a species of bird of prey in the family Accipitridae. It was formerly placed in the genus Accipiter. It is endemic to the island of Sulawesi in Indonesia. Its natural habitats are subtropical or tropical moist lowland forest, subtropical or tropical mangrove forest, and subtropical or tropical moist montane forest.

== Diet ==
It eats small passerine birds.
