= Slaty-mantled goshawk =

Conservation status
- Vulnerable (IUCN 3.1)

Scientific classification
- Kingdom: Animalia
- Phylum: Chordata
- Class: Aves
- Order: Accipitriformes
- Family: Accipitridae
- Genus: Tachyspiza
- Species: T. luteoschistacea

Binomial name
- Tachyspiza luteoschistacea (Rothschild & Hartert, 1926)

Species of bird

The slaty-mantled goshawk (Tachyspiza luteoschistacea), also known as the slaty-mantled sparrowhawk or slaty-backed sparrowhawk, is a species of bird of prey in the family Accipitridae. It was formerly placed in the genus Accipiter. It is threatened by habitat loss. It is endemic to the Bismarck Archipelago (Papua New Guinea). Its natural habitat is subtropical or tropical moist lowland forest.
