= Goshawk =

Goshawk may refer to several species of birds of prey in the family Accipitridae:

Palearctic

- Eurasian goshawk, Astur gentilis, often referred to simply as the goshawk, since it is the only goshawk found in much of its range (in Europe and Asia).

Nearctic

- American goshawk, Astur atricapillus, often referred to simply as the goshawk, since it is the only goshawk found in much of its range (in North America).

Afrotropical

- African goshawk, Aerospiza tachiro
- Red-chested goshawk, Aerospiza toussenelii
- Henst's goshawk, Astur henstii
- Pale chanting goshawk, Melierax canorus
- Dark chanting goshawk, Melierax metabates
- Eastern chanting goshawk, Melierax poliopterus
- Gabar goshawk, Micronisus gabar
- Little-banded goshawk, Tachyspiza badius

Australasian

- Meyer's goshawk, Astur meyerianus
- Chestnut-shouldered goshawk, Erythrotriorchis buergersi
- Red goshawk, Erythrotriorchis radiatus
- Doria's goshawk, Megatriorchis doriae
- Pied goshawk, Tachyspiza albogularis
- †Powerful goshawk, Tachyspiza efficax
- Brown goshawk, Tachyspiza fasciatus
  - Christmas goshawk, Tachyspiza fasciatus natalis
- White-bellied goshawk, Tachyspiza haplochrous
- Moluccan goshawk, Tachyspiza henicogrammus
- Imitator goshawk, Tachyspiza imitator
- Slaty-mantled goshawk Tachyspiza luteoschistaceus
- Black-mantled goshawk, Tachyspiza melanochlamys
- Grey goshawk, Tachyspiza novaehollandiae
- Grey-headed goshawk, Tachyspiza poliocephalus
- New Britain goshawk, Tachyspiza princeps
- †Gracile goshawk, Tachyspiza quartus

Indomalayan

- Crested goshawk, Lophospiza trivirgatus
- Sulawesi goshawk, Lophospiza griseiceps

Oceanian

- Fiji goshawk, Tachyspiza rufitorques
