= List of endemic birds of New Caledonia =

This article is one of a series providing information about endemism among birds in the world's various zoogeographic zones. For an overview of this subject, see Endemism in birds.

== Patterns of endemism ==
New Caledonia has a single endemic family, the Rhynochetidae, which has one extant species, the kagu.

== Endemic Bird Areas ==
Birdlife International has defined the whole of New Caledonia—the main island of Grande Terre, the Loyalty Islands (Ouvéa, Lifou and Maré), the Île des Pins and other smaller surrounding islands—as an Endemic Bird Area (EBA).

== List of species ==
The following is a list of species endemic to New Caledonia. Except where indicated, the species is only found on Grande Terre.

- White-bellied goshawk
- †Powerful goshawk
- †Gracile goshawk
- New Caledonian rail
- †New Caledonian gallinule
- New Caledonian buttonquail
- Kagu
- †Lowland kagu
- Cloven-feathered dove
- New Caledonian imperial pigeon
- †New Caledonian ground dove
- New Caledonian lorikeet
- Horned parakeet - found on Grande Terre and Ouvéa
- New Caledonian nightjar
- New Caledonian owlet-nightjar
- †New Caledonian barn owl
- New Caledonian cuckooshrike
- New Caledonian grassbird
- Yellow-bellied robin
- New Caledonian whistler
- Large Lifou white-eye - found only on Lifou
- Green-backed white-eye - found on Grande Terre and Maré
- Small Lifou white-eye - found only on Lifou
- New Caledonian myzomela
- New Caledonian friarbird - found on Grande Terre, Lifou and Maré
- Crow honeyeater
- Barred honeyeater
- Red-throated parrotfinch
- Striated starling - found on Grande Terre, Ouvéa, Lifou and Maré
- New Caledonian crow - native only on Grande Terre, but introduced on Maré

=== Subspecies ===
The following restricted-range species are also found in this EBA:

- Red-bellied fruit dove
- Melanesian cuckooshrike
- Long-tailed triller
- Fan-tailed gerygone
- Southern shrikebill
- Melanesian flycatcher
- Streaked fantail
- Cardinal myzomela
- Dark-brown honeyeater
