= Broadwing =

Broadwing may refer to:

- broad-winged hawk, a bird of prey.
- Broadwing, a bird of prey with broad wings such as eagles, falcons, buzzards, goshawks or sparrowhawks.
