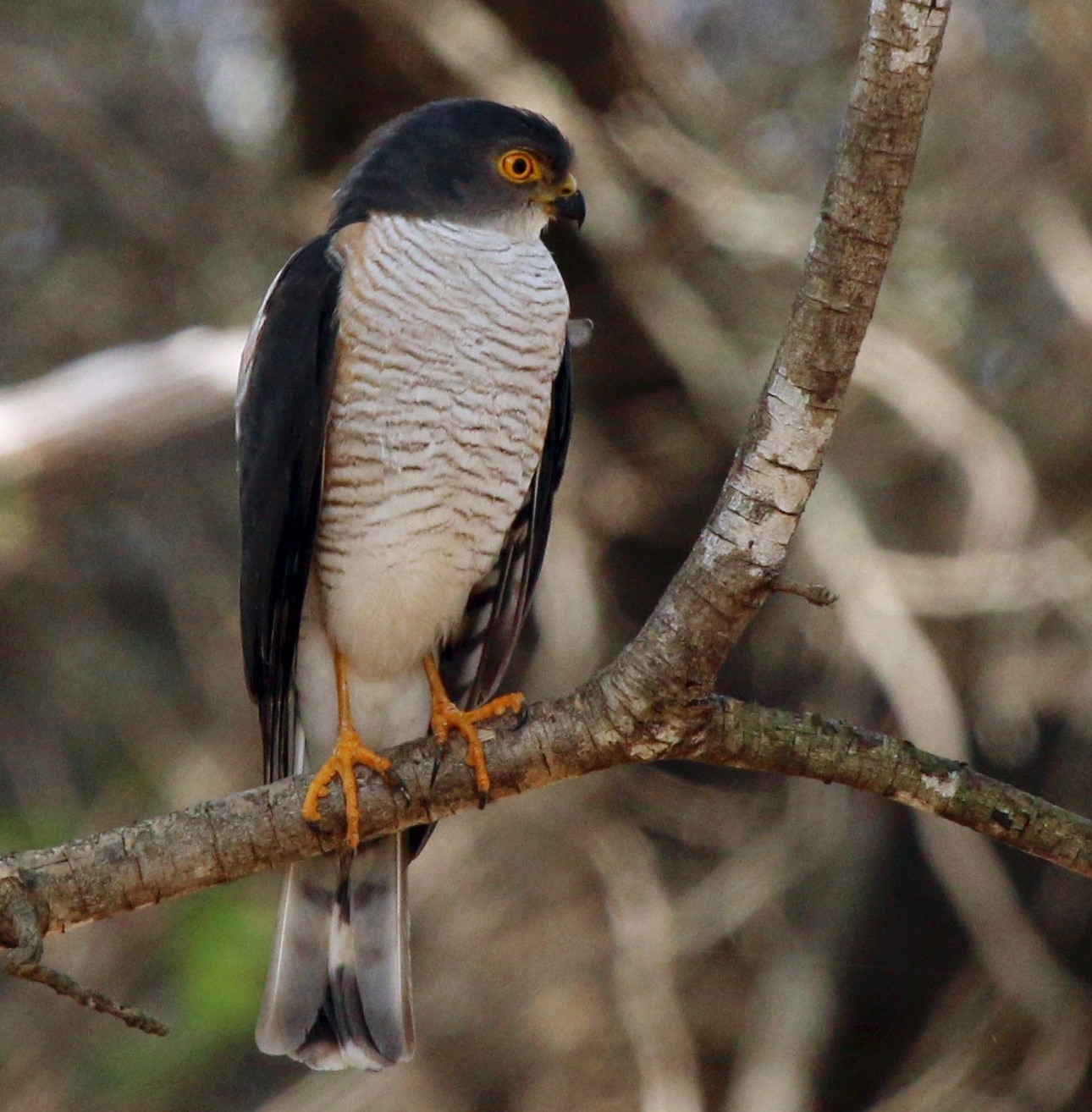

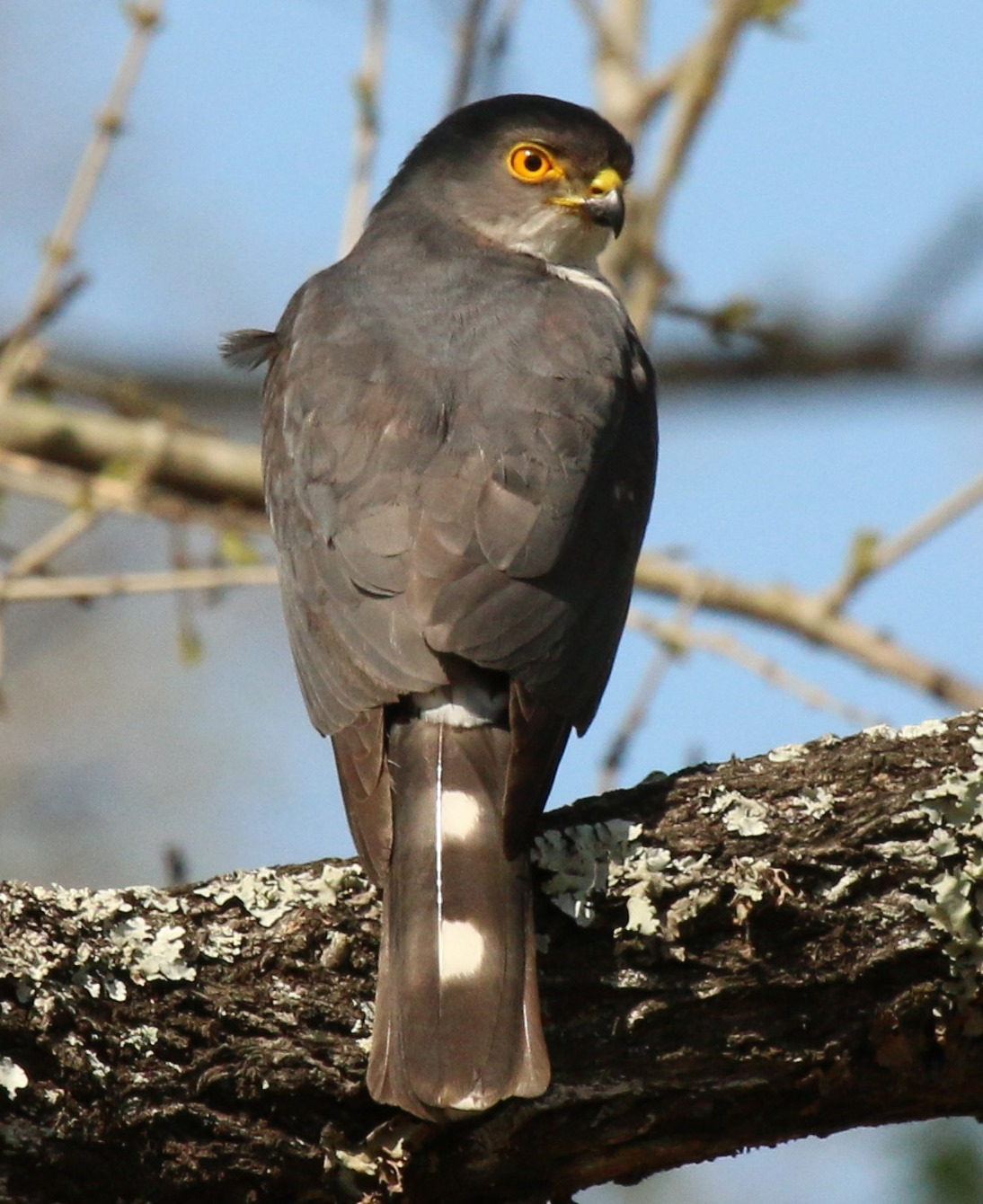
- At Phinda Game Reserve, South Africa, showing ventral and dorsal plumage

Conservation status
- Least Concern (IUCN 3.1)

Scientific classification
- Kingdom: Animalia
- Phylum: Chordata
- Class: Aves
- Order: Accipitriformes
- Family: Accipitridae
- Genus: Tachyspiza
- Species: T. minulla

Binomial name
- Tachyspiza minulla (Daudin, 1800)

Subspecies
- T. m. tropicalis - (Reichenow, 1898); T. m. minullus - (Daudin, 1800)

Synonyms
- Accipiter buttikoferi Sharpe 1888; Falco minullus Daudin, 1800

= Little sparrowhawk =

Species of bird

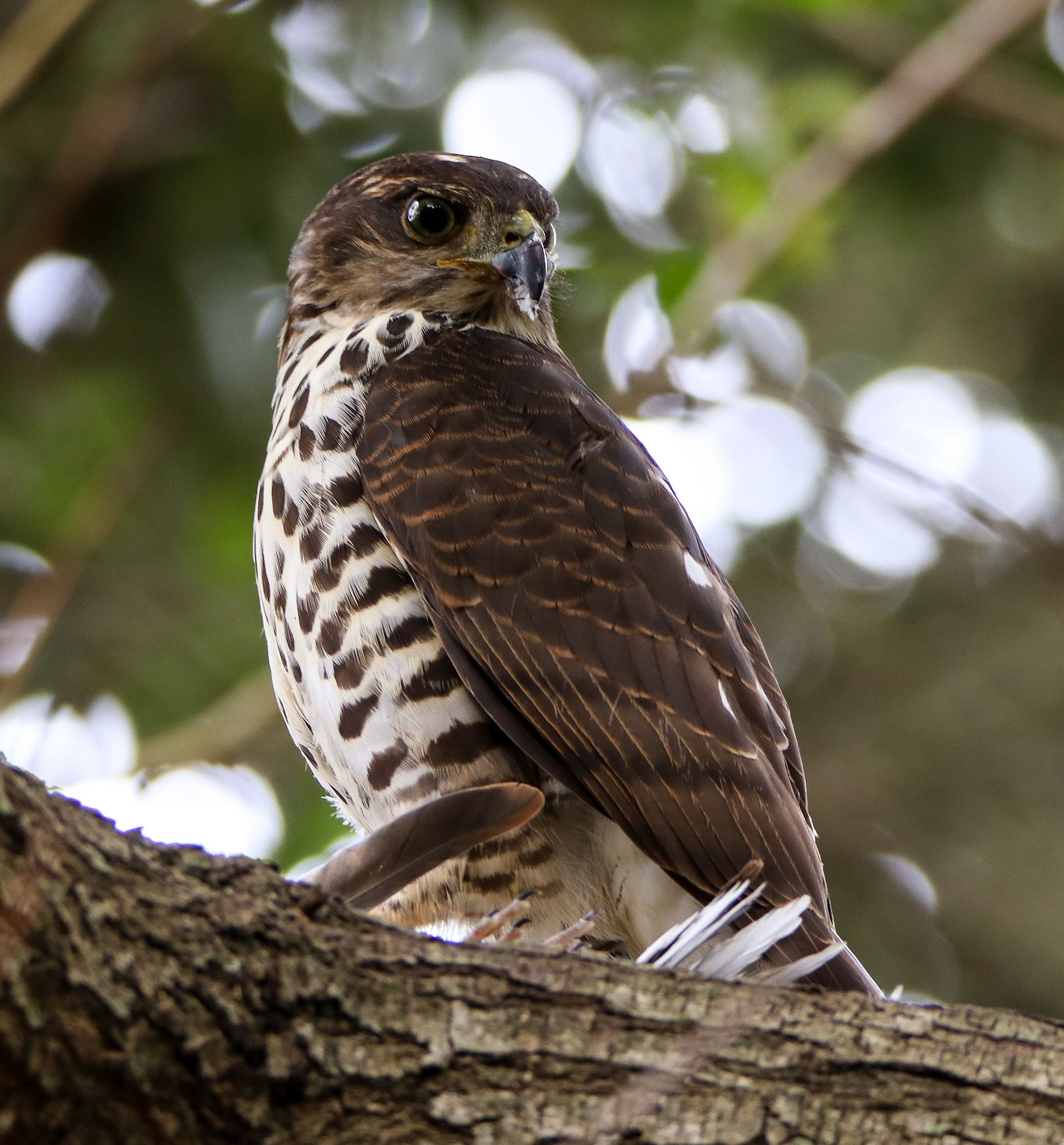
Juvenile little sparrowhawk - Onrus, Hermanus, South Africa

The little sparrowhawk (Tachyspiza minulla) is a species of Afrotropical bird of prey in the family Accipitridae. It was formerly placed in the genus Accipiter. It is the smallest member of the genus Tachyspiza and forms a superspecies with the red-thighed sparrowhawk (Tachyspiza erythropus).

== Taxonomy ==
The little sparrowhawk was formally described in 1800 by the French zoologist François Daudin under the binomial name Falco minullus. Daudin based his account on "le minulle" that had been described and illustrated by François Levaillant in 1798. Levaillant had collected his specimens near the Gamtoos River in the province of Eastern Cape in South Africa. The specific epithet minullus is Modern Latin meaning "very small". The little sparrowhawk was formerly assigned to the genus Accipiter. In 2024 a comprehensive molecular phylogenetic study of the Accipitridae confirmed earlier work that had shown that the genus was polyphyletic. To resolve the non-monophyly, Accipiter was divided into six genera. The genus Tachyspiza was resurrected to accommodate the little sparrowhawk together with 26 other species that had previously been placed in Accipiter. The resurrected genus had been introduced in 1844 by the German naturalist Johann Jakob Kaup. The genus name combines the Ancient Greek ταχυς (takhus) meaning "fast" with σπιζιας (spizias) meaning "hawk". The little sparrowhawk forms a superspecies with the red-thighed sparrowhawk (Tachyspiza erythropus).

Two subspecies are recognised:

- T. m. tropicalis (Reichenow, 1898) – south Somalia coastally to east Mozambique
- T. m. minulla (Daudin, 1800) – Ethiopia to Angola and South Africa

== Description ==
The little sparrowhawk is, as its name suggests, a very small bird of prey which is also distinguished by two white spots on the underside of its central tail feathers and by a narrow white patch on the lower rump. It is sexually dimorphic and the male has dark grey upperparts, which can appear almost black, this colour extending on to the cheeks to contrast with the white throat. The underparts are white barred with fine rufous bars. The females are overall browner on the upperparts and the underpart bars are also browner and less fine than the male. The juveniles are browner overall with pale tips to the upperpart feathers and is spotted with grown below rather than barred and the rump feathers have only the tips white, and shows dark. In adults the bill is black, the long legs and long toes are yellow, the cere is yellow and the eyes are deep yellow; in juveniles have a yellowish-green cere and brown eyes. The length is 23–27 cm (9.1–10.6 in); the wingspan is 39–50 cm (15–20 in), the male weighs 74–85 g (2.6–3.0 oz) and the female 68–105 g (2.4–3.7 oz).

== Distribution and habitat ==
The little sparrowhawk occurs in eastern and southern sub-Saharan Africa from Ethiopia south to the southern Democratic Republic of Congo and northern Angola, south as far as the eastern Western Cape in South Africa.

The little sparrowhawk is a woodland bird which can be found in patches of woodland and scrub, typically along river valleys. In drier areas it can be found in open areas such as fynbos and grassland, also in suburban gardens.

== Behaviour ==
=== Breeding ===
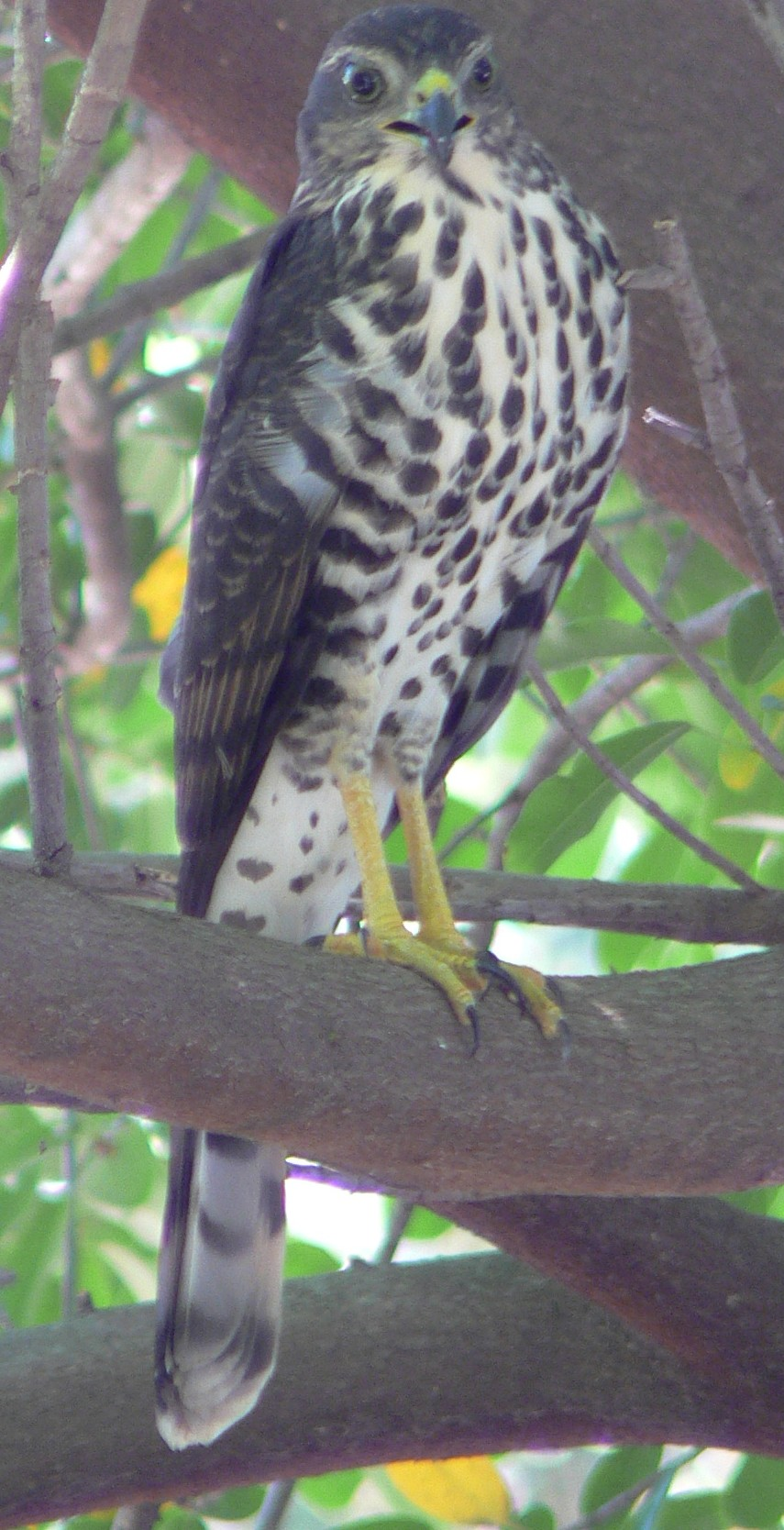
A juvenile bird in South Africa

The little sparrowhawk is a monogamous and territorial solitary nester. The male's display sees him perch with his body held parallel to the perch the sways his head from side to side. The female takes most of the responsibility of building the nest constructing a small stick platform which has a thin lining of green leaves. She typically places the nest in the main fork of a tree, favouring alien species, such as Eucalyptus, poplars, jacaranda and weeping willow. She will use old nest of a shikra or gabar goshawk rather than building her own nest.

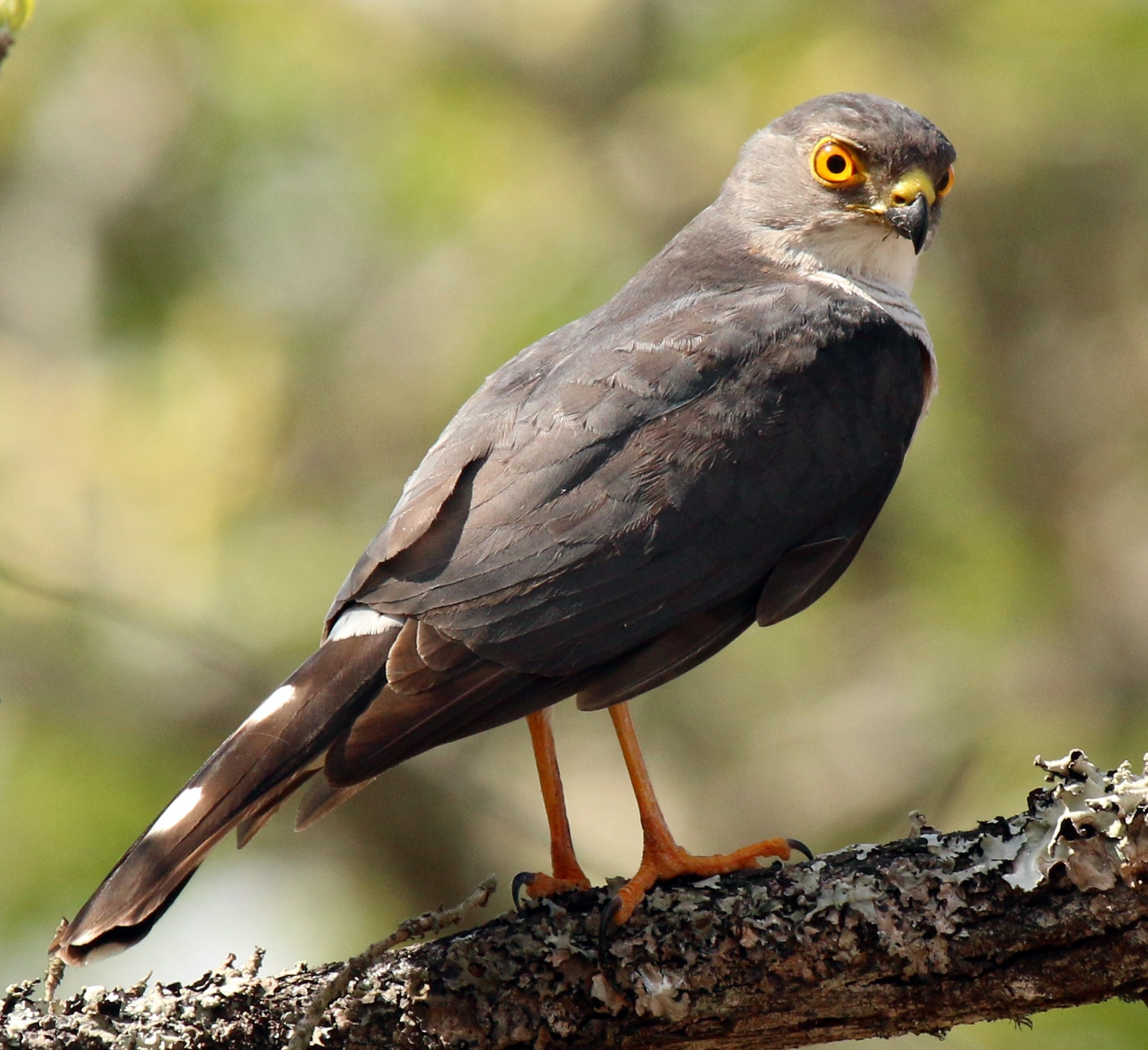
Adult bird at Phinda Game Reserve in South Africa

In southern Africa the one to three eggs are laid from September to December, with a peak in October. The eggs are incubated by both the male and the female for about 31–32 days, although the female will perform at least three quarters of the incubation. The male regularly brings food to the incubating female and he continues to do so as she takes responsibility for the brooding of the chicks, The male also defends the nest from any other birds which approach it and vigorously chases them away, very vigorously if the intruding bird is another bird of prey. The young fledge at about 25–27 days old, remaining on their parents' territory for up to a year. In other parts of Africa breeding has been recorded from March to April in north-eastern Africa and from October to November in western Kenya.

=== Food and feeding ===
The little sparrowhawk is a bird hunter, waiting in cover then pursuing prey in a short dash and capturing it in flight. The main prey is small birds up to the size of a thrush or a dove. Bats may also be caught and some prey is taken from the ground, including frogs, lizards and rodents. Larger insects and termites are also taken.

=== Predation ===
The recorded predators of adult little sparrowhawks include the gabar goshawk (Micronisus gabar), while chicks have sometimes been predated by lizard buzzards (Kaupifalco monogrammicus).
