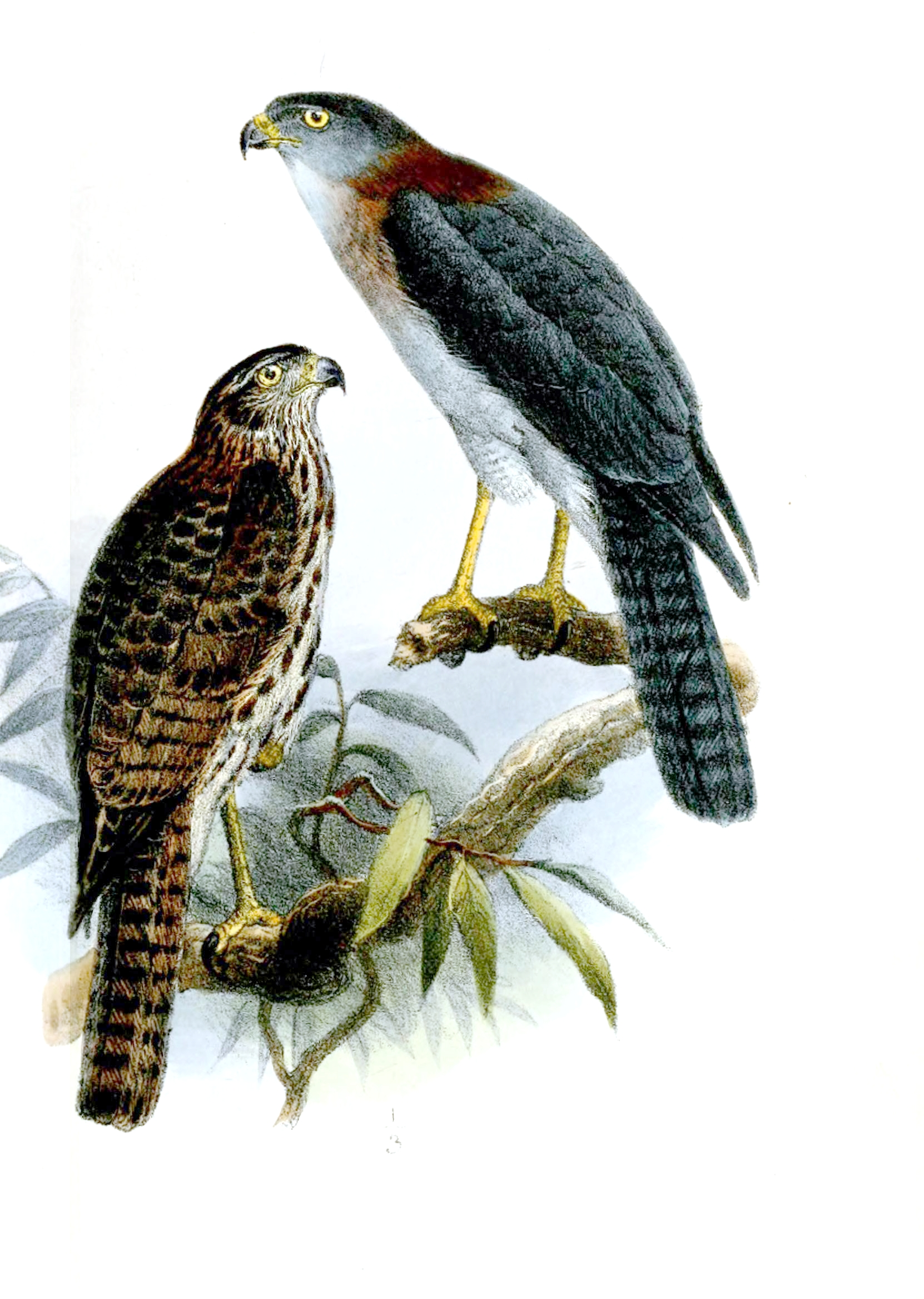

Conservation status
- Least Concern (IUCN 3.1)

Scientific classification
- Kingdom: Animalia
- Phylum: Chordata
- Class: Aves
- Order: Accipitriformes
- Family: Accipitridae
- Genus: Tachyspiza
- Species: T. erythrauchen

Binomial name
- Tachyspiza erythrauchen (G. R. Gray, 1861)

Subspecies
- T. e. erythrauchen (G. R. Gray, 1861); T. e. ceramensis (Schlegel, 1862)

Synonyms
- Accipiter erythrauchen G. R. Gray, 1861

= Rufous-necked sparrowhawk =

Species of bird

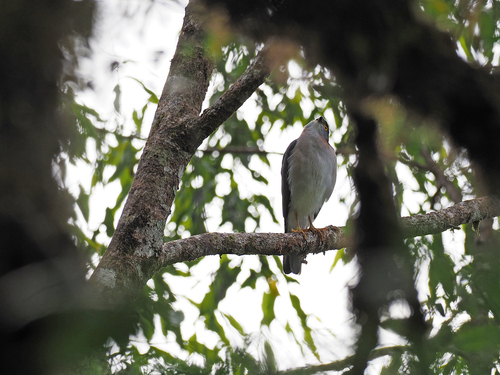
On tree

The 'rufous-necked sparrowhawk' (Tachyspiza erythrauchen) is a species of bird of prey belonging to the family Accipitridae, which includes the hawks, buzzards, Old World vultures, eagles, kites, harriers and related taxa. This sparrowhawk is endemic to Indonesia.

== Taxonomy ==
The rufous-necked sparrowhawk was first formally described in 1861 as Accipiter erythrauchen by the British ornithologist and curator George Robert Gray with its type locality given as Gilolo. This species is classified in the genus Tachyspiza which was described in 1844 by Johann Jakob Kaup with the Chinese sparrowhawk (Falco soloensis) as its type species. Tachyspiza was formery considered to be a junior synonym of Accipiter but molecular phylogenetic studies found that Accipiter was polyphyletic and in the subsequent rearrangement to create monophyletic genera, the genus Tachyspiza was resurrected to contain 27 species that were previously placed in Accipiter. Thise genus Tachyspiza is classified in the subfamily Accipitrinae, the "true" hawks, in the family Accipitridae.

=== Subspecies ===
The rufous-necked sparrowhawk has the following subspecies:

- Tachyspiza erythrauchen erythrauchen (G. R. Gray, 1861): northern Moluccas (Morotai, Halmahera, Bacan, and Obi)
- Tachyspiza erythrauchen ceramensis (Schlegel, 1862): southern Moluccas (Buru, Ambon, and Seram)

== Etymology ==
The rufous-necked sparrowhawk is classified in the genus Tachyspiza, this name combines the Ancient Greek ταχυς (takhus) meaning "fast" with σπιζιας (spizias) meaning "hawk". The specific name erythrauchen means "red neck".

== Description ==
The rufous-necked sparrowhawk is a small, slender hawk with a yellow bill cere, yellow legs, and orange-yellow eyes. The adults have slate-grey upperparts with a rufous collar and a dark pink breast that fades towards the belly to pale pink in birds from the north Moluccas and to white in birds from the south Moluccas. Immatures are brown with heavy streaking on the underparts. The rufous collar of the adults distinguishes this species from adult Chinese sparrowhawk, Moluccan goshawk and the central Moluccan subspecies of variable goshawk. Unlike Chinese sparrowhawk the underwings of the rufous-thraoed sparrowhawk are not white with black wingtips.The call is a series of shtill “ki-ki-ki-ki…” notes.

== Distribution and habitat ==
The rufous-necked sparrowhaw is found in the Moluccas where it has been recorded on the islands of Morotai, Halmahera, Bacan and Obi in the northern Moluccas and Buru, Ambon, Haruku, Saparua, Nusa and Seram in the southern Moluccas. It is found up to 1,450 m (4,760 ft) above sea level in primary lowland forest and hills, and it may also occur in tree plantations and selectively logged lowland forest.
