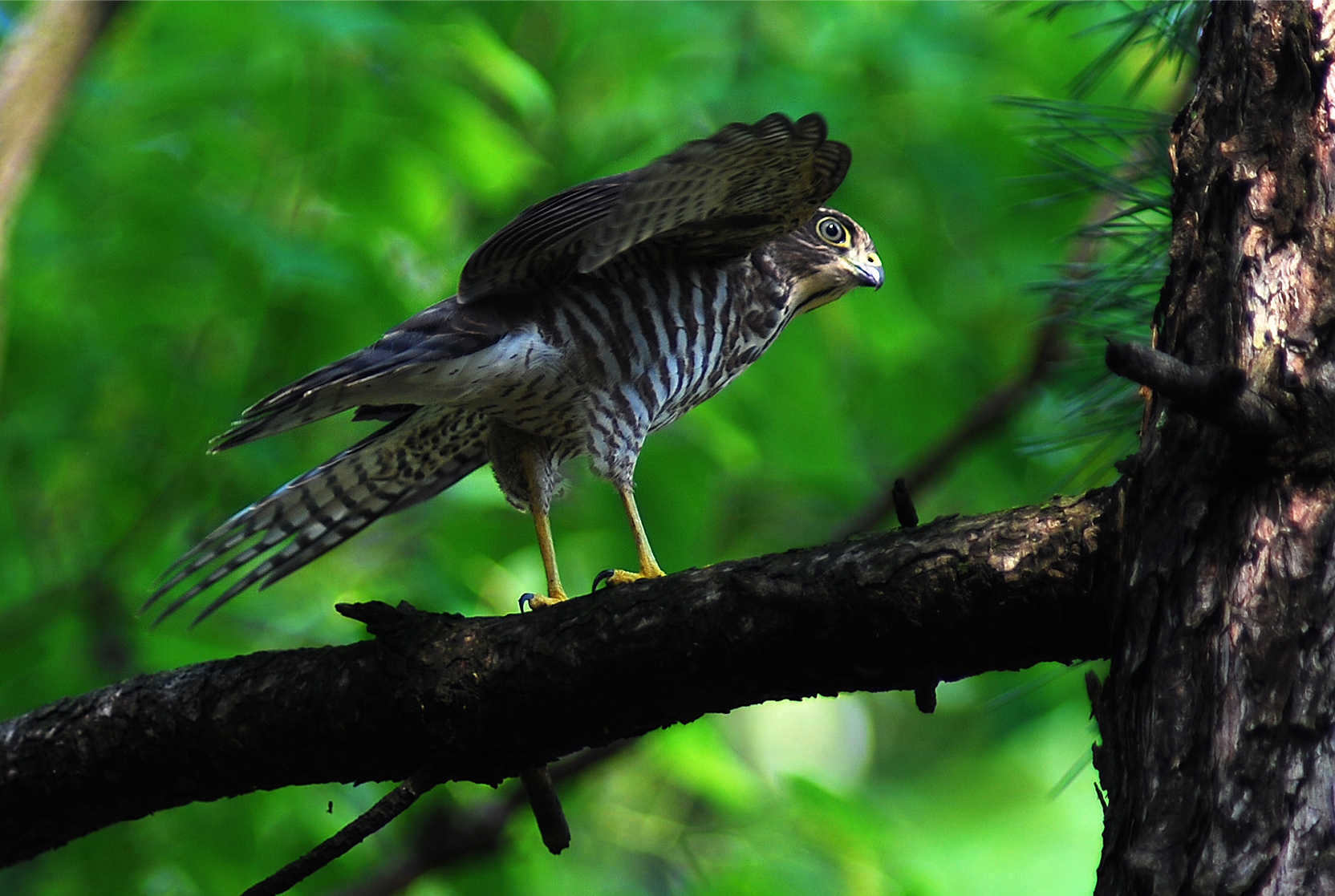

Conservation status
- Least Concern (IUCN 3.1)

Scientific classification
- Kingdom: Animalia
- Phylum: Chordata
- Class: Aves
- Order: Accipitriformes
- Family: Accipitridae
- Genus: Tachyspiza
- Species: T. gularis

Binomial name
- Tachyspiza gularis (Temminck & Schlegel, 1845)

Subspecies
- T. g. gularis - (Temminck & Schlegel, 1845); T. g. sibiricus - (Stepanyan, 1959); T. g. iwasakii - (Mishima, 1962)

= Japanese sparrowhawk =

Species of bird

The Japanese sparrowhawk (Tachyspiza gularis) is a bird of prey in the family Accipitridae which also includes many other diurnal raptors such as eagles, buzzards and harriers. It was formerly placed in the genus Accipiter. The bird is known by many alternative names such as the Japanese lesser, Asiatic, or Eastern sparrowhawk. This species is a small raptor with broader and rounder wings and a shorter tail. Its total length measures 23–30 centimetres (9.1–11.8 in). It has a dark back and whitish underside with brown-grey barring and red-brown colouring on the sides in males, and with heavier brown barring on the abdomen in females. Both sexes have a stripe across the throat, but its more obvious in the female. Is it typically identified by its appearance, but occasionally produces a chattering kiki-kik-kik... sound. This species generally breeds in parts of Russia, Korea, Japan, and China. There are three subspecies of Japanese sparrowhawk that differ by distribution and appearance. The species is globally listed as least concern, although it is listed as endangered in Japan and protected in China.

== Taxonomy ==
The Japanese sparrowhawk was formally described in 1845 by the zoologists Coenraad Jacob Temminck and Hermann Schlegel in Philipp Franz von Siebold's Fauna Japonica. They specified the scientific name Astur (Nisus) gularis, where Nisus was an alternative possible genus: it had been introduced by Georges Cuvier in 1800. The specific epithet gularis is Modern Latin meaning "of the throat" or "throated".

The Japanese sparrowhawk was formerly placed in the genus Accipiter. In 2024 a comprehensive molecular phylogenetic study of the Accipitridae confirmed earlier work that had shown that the genus was polyphyletic. To resolve the non-monophyly, Accipiter was divided into six genera. The genus Tachyspiza was resurrected to accommodate the Japanese sparrowhawk together with 26 other species that had previously been placed in Accipiter. The resurrected genus had been introduced in 1844 by the German naturalist Johann Jakob Kaup. The genus name combines the Ancient Greek ταχυς (takhus) meaning "fast" with σπιζιας (spizias) meaning "hawk".

The species is closely related to the Besra (Tachyspiza virgata). For a time, it was thought the Japanese sparrowhawk was a migratory subspecies of the Besra, but that was disproved. It was then thought that the Besra and Japanese sparrowhawk were two very closely related species. However, it was recently discovered that they are not as closely related despite their similar appearances and might be more closely related to the collared sparrowhawk (Tachyspiza cirrocephala) of Australasia.

Three subspecies are recognised:

- T. g. sibirica (Stepanyan, 1959) – Mongolia to east China
- T. g. gularis (Temminck & Schlegel, 1845) – northeast China, Russian Far East and Japan
- T. g. iwasakii (Mishima, 1962) – south Ryukyu Islands (Japan)

== Description ==
Adult male Japanese sparrowhawks measure between 23–30 centimetres (9.1–11.8 in) in length with a wingspan measuring 46–58 centimetres (18–23 in), and weigh 92–142 grams (3.2–5.0 oz). They have a small, curved bill, long pointed wingtips, a relatively short-tail and long, slim legs and toes. Adult males have black-slate upperparts with white on the nape of the neck. They have whitish underparts with grey-brown and washed red-brown barring. Adult males have yellow legs and their tail feathers are grey with four dark bands. They have red-orange eyes with brown-grey patches on the cheeks, and a subtle line on their white throats.

In flight, adult males appear to have a faint red-brown wash on either side of the chest, distinct brown-grey bars on wing-linings and flanks, and their flight feathers have thin bands.

Adult females are larger than their male counterparts, weighing around 111–193 centimetres (44–76 in). They have brown upperparts, but they do not have any red-brown barring on their underparts or sides. Adult females have a white body and wing-linings with brown-grey barring. They have yellow eyes, and like the adult males, have yellow legs and a stripe over the throat, but it is more obvious on adult females.

Juveniles are dark brown on the upperparts with buff or red-brown sides. They have cream-coloured underparts with red-brown streaking on the breast, spots on the abdomen and barring on their sides. They also have white above the eye and the nape of the neck with thin bars on the tail feathers. Juveniles also have a throat stripe, but their eyes are brown, and their feet are yellow-green.

Overall, these descriptions remain the same among the Tachyspiza gularis gularis and T. g. sibiricus subspecies. However, the adult iwasakii subspecies is smaller with a darker back, broader spots on the abdomen, lighter-coloured eyes and more rounded wingtips than the other two subspecies.

== Distribution and habitat ==
The Japanese sparrowhawk typically inhabits many forest types such as deciduous, coniferous and mixed, at elevations up to 1800 meters but usually below 1000 meters. It prefers southern taiga and subalpine zones near rivers. During migration and wintering, they can be seen in villages, and open areas where woodlands and shrubs mix with marshes and fields.

The species can generally be found at its breeding grounds in eastern Russia, eastwards to Sakhalin, the Korean peninsula, Japan, and Northeastern China. Although, the distribution of the Japanese sparrowhawk varies by and within subspecies. Tachyspiza gularis sibiricus is migratory and breeds from Mongolia to eastern China and is thought to winter in southeast Asia and Indonesia. Alternatively, Tachyspiza g. iwasakii is sedentary and lives solely in evergreen subtropical forests on the South Ryukyu Islands of Japan. Whereas, Tachyspiza g. gularis is the most widespread subspecies and is made up of two major populations. The first is migratory and breeds in northeast China, in the most eastern parts of Russia, as well as Japan. It winters in the Philippines and Indonesia. The second major population of T. g. gularis are resident breeders in urban and suburban Japan.

== Behaviour ==
The Japanese sparrowhawk is secretive and not often seen outside forested areas during the breeding season. At this time, it is either alone or coupled. During migration, it can be seen in dashing flight and soaring. They migrate from mid-September until November and from mid-April until June. While migrating, they are typically flying alone or in small flocks. In winter, they are seen perched in more open areas.

=== Vocalizations ===
The Japanese sparrowhawk vocalizes solely while breeding. The main call consists of a chattering kiki-kik-kik... sound. The speed and volume of the call can change according to the circumstances. For example, it is slower during advertisement and contact between a couple, and softer while bringing prey and soliciting. Whereas, during territorial or defensive displays against intruders, humans or predators, the call is much faster. Other reported sounds are a mewing key-key and a shrill kee-bick, as well as a kwu between mates prior to nesting.

=== Food and feeding ===
The Japanese sparrowhawk hunts in clearings by surprising prey from perches and by chasing in flight. It often hunts small forest passerines like sparrows, buntings, warblers, tits, nuthatches, and sometimes larger birds like magpies and pigeons. But, it also opportunistically preys on small mammals like voles, and bats, as well as insects and occasionally reptiles.

=== Breeding ===
The Japanese sparrowhawk breeds from June to August. Individuals find a partners and begin with a pre-nesting display whereby both members make kwu sounds while bowing their heads and lifting their tails on a perch. They also perform aerial displays that include undulating sky dances, high-circling and slow flapping. The couple will build their nest in a tree, typically near the tree trunk and around 10 meters off the ground. The nest is composed of twigs and lined with leaves and pieces of bark. They lay clutches of 4 to 5 eggs in June in Siberia and 2 to 3 eggs a bit earlier in China and Japan. The incubation period lasts between 25 and 28 days, and chicks fledge in June in Japan and August in Siberia.

== Conservation status ==
The Japanese sparrowhawk is globally listed as least concern by the IUCN Red List and the population is considered stable with an estimated 13,400 to 67,000 mature adults. However, it is a class II protected species in China Moreover, the A. g. iwasakii subspecies is classified as endangered in the Red Data Book of the Japan Ministry of the Environment due to declines in nesting spots and breeding success, but its estimated population size and life history parameters remain poorly understood.
