= New Caledonian gallinule =

Conservation status
- Extinct (IUCN 3.1)

Scientific classification
- Kingdom: Animalia
- Phylum: Chordata
- Class: Aves
- Order: Gruiformes
- Family: Rallidae
- Genus: Porphyrio
- Species: †P. kukwiedei

Binomial name
- †Porphyrio kukwiedei Balouet & Olson, 1989

Extinct species of bird

The New Caledonian gallinule (Porphyrio kukwiedei) is an extinct species of bird in the family Rallidae. It was endemic to New Caledonia and probably became extinct due to hunting, habitat loss and the presence of invasive species following human settlement of the island. However a passage from an 1860 article refers to birds the size of turkeys being present in marshy areas of New Caledonia, suggesting that it may have survived into historic times. The native name n'dino is thought to refer to this bird.

It was described from subfossil bones found at the Pindai Caves paleontological site on the west coast of Grande Terre. The specific epithet derives from Kukwiede, the name of a local deity associated with a legend leading to the discovery of a bone of the gallinule on the Isle of Pines.
