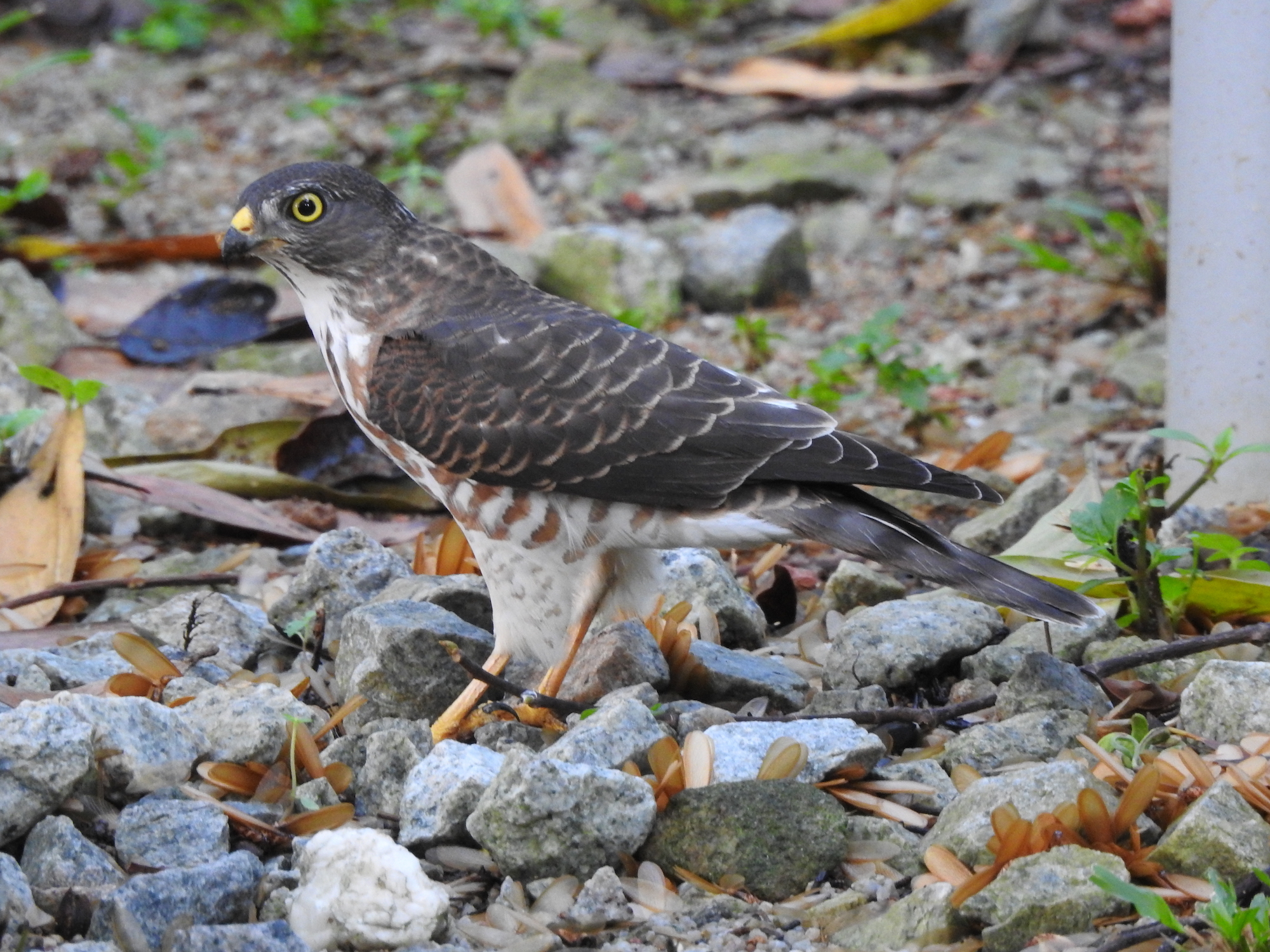
- Chinese sparrowhawk (Tachyspiza soloensis)

Scientific classification
- Kingdom: Animalia
- Phylum: Chordata
- Class: Aves
- Order: Accipitriformes
- Family: Accipitridae
- Subfamily: Accipitrinae
- Genus: Tachyspiza; Kaup, 1844

Type species
- Tachyspiza soloensis Horsfield, 1821

= Tachyspiza =

Genus of birds

Tachyspiza is a genus containing goshawks and sparrowhawks in the family Accipitridae. The species were formerly placed in the genus Accipiter.

== Taxonomy ==
The genus Tachyspiza was introduced in 1844 by the German naturalist Johann Jakob Kaup with Falco soloensis Horsfield (Chinese sparrowhawk) as the type species. The name combines the Ancient Greek ταχυς (takhus) meaning "fast" with σπιζιας (spizias) meaning "hawk".

Species now placed in this genus were formerly assigned to the genus Accipiter. Molecular phylogenetic studies found that Accipiter was polyphyletic and in the subsequent rearrangement to create monophyletic genera, the genus Tachyspiza was resurrected to contain 27 species that were previously placed in Accipiter.

The genus contains 27 species:

- Pied goshawk, Tachyspiza albogularis – Solomon Islands
- Shikra, Tachyspiza badia – Afrotropics and Asia
- New Britain sparrowhawk, Tachyspiza brachyura – New Britain and New Ireland
- Levant sparrowhawk, Tachyspiza brevipes – breeds southeast Europe to west Kazakhstan; winters in central Africa
- Nicobar sparrowhawk, Tachyspiza butleri – Nicobar Islands
- Collared sparrowhawk, Tachyspiza cirrocephala – New Guinea and Australia
- Brown goshawk, Tachyspiza fasciata – Australia and the south-west Pacific
- Frances's sparrowhawk, Tachyspiza francesiae – Comoros (except Mohéli) and Madagascar
- Rufous-necked sparrowhawk, Tachyspiza erythrauchen – Moluccas
- Red-thighed sparrowhawk, Tachyspiza erythropus – west, west-central Africa
- Japanese sparrowhawk, Tachyspiza gularis – breeds east Palearctic; winters Southeast Asia
- White-bellied goshawk, Tachyspiza haplochroa – Grande Terre (New Caledonia)
- Moluccan goshawk, Tachyspiza henicogramma – north Moluccas
- Variable goshawk, Tachyspiza hiogaster – Moluccas and Lesser Sundas to New Guinea, Bismarck Archipelago and Solomon Islands
- Imitator goshawk, Tachyspiza imitator – north, east Solomon Islands
- Slaty-mantled goshawk, Tachyspiza luteoschistacea – southeast Bismarck Archipelago
- Black-mantled goshawk, Tachyspiza melanochlamys – montane New Guinea
- Little sparrowhawk, Tachyspiza minulla – south, south-central, east Africa
- Dwarf sparrowhawk, Tachyspiza nanus – Sulawesi
- Grey goshawk, Tachyspiza novaehollandiae – north, east Australia
- Grey-headed goshawk, Tachyspiza poliocephala – New Guinea
- New Britain goshawk, Tachyspiza princeps – New Britain
- Vinous-breasted sparrowhawk, Tachyspiza rhodogaster – Sulawesi, Banggai and Sula Islands
- Fiji goshawk, Tachyspiza rufitorques – Fiji
- Chinese sparrowhawk, Tachyspiza soloensis – breeds east Siberia, Korean Peninsula and China; winters south China and Taiwan through Philippines and Indonesian archipelago to Maluku Islands
- Spot-tailed sparrowhawk, Tachyspiza trinotata – Sulawesi
- Besra, Tachyspiza virgata – south, southeast Asia

== Extinct species ==
- †Powerful goshawk Tachyspiza efficax – New Caledonia
- †Gracile goshawk Tachyspiza quartus – New Caledonia
