= Gracile goshawk =

Gracile goshawk Temporal range: Holocene

Conservation status
- Extinct

Scientific classification
- Kingdom: Animalia
- Phylum: Chordata
- Class: Aves
- Order: Accipitriformes
- Family: Accipitridae
- Genus: Tachyspiza
- Species: †T. quartus

Binomial name
- †Tachyspiza quartus Balouet & Olson, 1989

Extinct species of bird

The gracile goshawk (Tachyspiza quartus) is an extinct species of bird of prey in the family Accipitridae. It was endemic to the islands of New Caledonia in Melanesia in the southwest Pacific region. It was described from subfossil bones found at the Pindai Caves paleontological site on the west coast of Grande Terre. The specific epithet quartus means "fourth"; it was the fourth Accipiter species recorded from New Caledonia (although it is now placed in the genus Tachyspiza). The gracile goshawk was smaller and much less robust than its contemporary congener the powerful goshawk, remains of which were also found at the same site.
