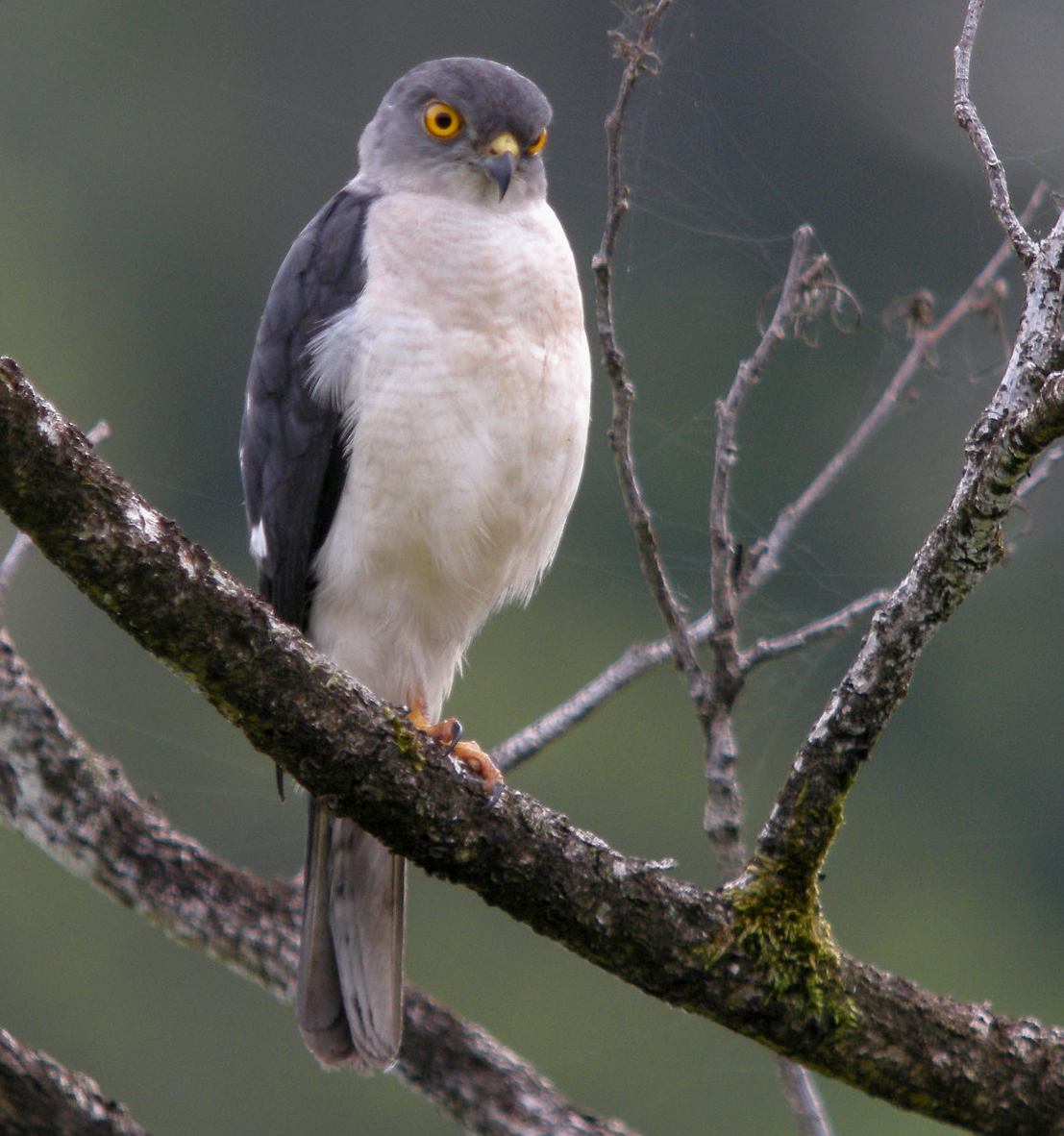
- Nominate race

Conservation status
- Least Concern (IUCN 3.1)

Scientific classification
- Kingdom: Animalia
- Phylum: Chordata
- Class: Aves
- Order: Accipitriformes
- Family: Accipitridae
- Genus: Tachyspiza
- Species: T. francesiae

Binomial name
- Tachyspiza francesiae (Smith, A, 1834)

Subspecies
- T. f. francesiae - (Smith, A, 1834); T. f. griveaudi - (Benson, 1960); T. f. pusillus - (Gurney, JH Sr, 1875); T. f. brutus - (Schlegel, 1865)

Synonyms
- Accipiter francesii

= Frances's sparrowhawk =

Species of bird

Frances's sparrowhawk (Tachyspiza francesiae) is a small bird of prey. This species was formerly placed in the genus Accipiter. The nominate subspecies, T. f. francesiae, is endemic to Madagascar, and the other subspecies are found in the Comoro Islands. The Anjouan sparrowhawk (Tachyspiza francesiae pusillus), also known as the Anjouan Island sparrowhawk, Ndzuwani goshawk or Joanna Island goshawk, was thought to be extinct until searches in the 1980s and in 2005 confirmed that it is still extant.

The name "Frances's sparrowhawk" commemorates Lady Frances Cole (died 1847), wife of the Cape Colony governor Galbraith Lowry Cole.

== Taxonomy ==
Frances's sparrowhawk was formally described in 1834 by the Scottish zoologist Andrew Smith under the binomial name Accipiter francesii. Smith designated the type locality as Madagascar and thanked Lady Frances Cole for providing the specimen. Lady Frances Cole was the wife of Galbraith Lowry Cole, Governor of the Cape Colony from 1828 to 1833. Under the rules of the International Code of Zoological Nomenclature, the specific epithet has been changed from francesii to francesiae.

Frances's sparrowhawk was formerly placed in the genus Accipiter. In 2024 a comprehensive molecular phylogenetic study of the Accipitridae confirmed earlier work that had shown that the genus was polyphyletic. To resolve the non-monophyly, Accipiter was divided into six genera. The genus Tachyspiza was resurrected to accommodate Frances's sparrowhawk together with 26 other species that had previously been placed in Accipiter. The genus Tachyspiza had been introduced in 1844 by the German naturalist Johann Jakob Kaup. The genus name combines the Ancient Greek ταχυς (takhus) meaning "fast" with σπιζιας (spizias) meaning "hawk".

Four subspecies are recognised:

- T. f. francesiae (Smith, A, 1834) – Madagascar
- T. f. griveaudi (Benson, 1960) – Grande Comore (northwest Comoro Islands)
- T. f. pusilla (Gurney, JH Sr, 1875) – Anjouan (central east Comoro Islands)
- T. f. bruta (Schlegel, 1865) – Mayotte (southeast Comoro Islands)

== Description ==
Frances's sparrowhawk is grey with a light belly. It has orange eyes and feet, a yellow cere and a black beak. The size of each hawk varies from 28 – 35 cm for a male and 104 – 140 g for a female 112 – 185 g and their wingspan is around 40 – 54 cm. The races from the Comoro Islands are smaller and more rufous than the nominate from Madagascar.

Both sexes of the Anjouan sparrowhawk resemble the male of the nominate race of Frances's sparrowhawk from Madagascar, but are markedly smaller and lack most of the barring on the underside. Males have a wingspan of 135–149 millimetres (5.3–5.9 in) and a tail 99–188 mm (3.9–7.4 in) long, while females are larger, having a wingspan of 155–163 mm (6.1–6.4 in) and a tail length of 113–125 mm (4.4–4.9 in). Both sexes have white underparts, grey upperparts, dark-greyish wings, and dark barring on the tail.

== Distribution and habitat ==
Frances's sparrowhawk is found in Madagascar and the Comoro Islands. They live in dense forests, large gardens, parks and coconut plantations. They live mostly on the edges of forests.

== Behaviour ==
=== Food and feeding ===
The hawks feed on a range of prey, including mammals, birds, lizards, frogs, and large insects. They knock small mammals, lizards and frog off trees or trunks of trees to shock them and then make the kill. They generally attack flying insects and birds flying straight towards the prey and catching them in mid-flight.

=== Breeding ===
The sparrowhawks build large stick nests in the upper fork of large trees usually 5 - 15m from the ground. The location of the nests change from year to year and they usually breed in October to December the clutch varies from 3 - 4 eggs they measure around 37 x 29 mm but the average survival rate of the eggs is 1.5. Eggs usually have different and unique marking on them. The eggs are usually a greyish-white.

== Threats ==
Frances's sparrowhawk has no real predators. At one point during the 1900s to 1980s due to the prevalence of a chemical poison the species saw a large population decline . After these chemicals were banned, the hawks' numbers slowly increased and now it is estimated that more than 32,000 breeding pairs that live throughout Madagascar. Traditional hunting still occurs.

== Conservation status ==
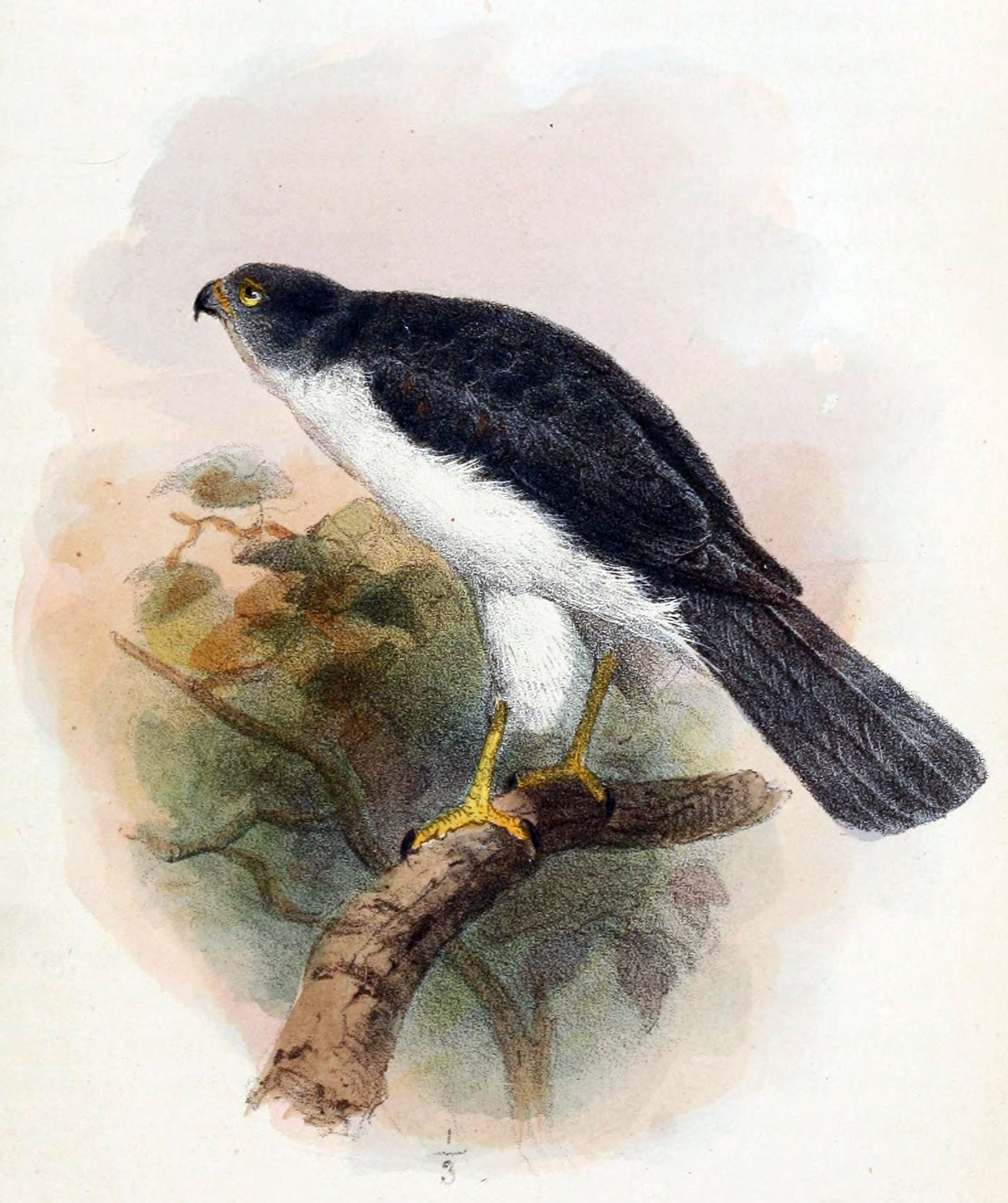
Illustration of the Anjouan subspecies from 1864

Due to extensive hunting and habitat loss during the 20th century, the Anjouan sparrowhawk became extremely rare by the late 1950s. Only one individual was found in a month-long survey in 1958 and the population was estimated at between one and ten birds. Another expedition in 1965 spent 3 days on Ndzuwani without encountering the bird (although no dedicated effort was made, and the sparrowhawk's key habitat was not visited); the authors remarked that other subspecies were "extremely tame".

In the period until 1907, 44 specimens were taken, one of which is on display in the Zoological Museum of the University of Zurich, Switzerland. The last population lived in the mountainous central uplands, but between 1958 and 1977, no sightings were made.

Other subspecies of Frances's sparrowhawk on other islands in the Comoros have not suffered the same losses. One possible cause is the deforestation caused by human population growth; T. f. griveaudii has declined recently on Grande Comore, coinciding with a significant increase in the human population, while T. f. brutus is still common on Mayotte where extensive lowland forest remains, and human population density is around 75% of that on Ndzuwani.

One individual is seen in the BBC series "Unknown Africa Episode 1: The Comoros" when the film crew is taken to a remnant rain forest patch on Anjouan by the director of Action Comores in search of Livingstone's flying fox.
