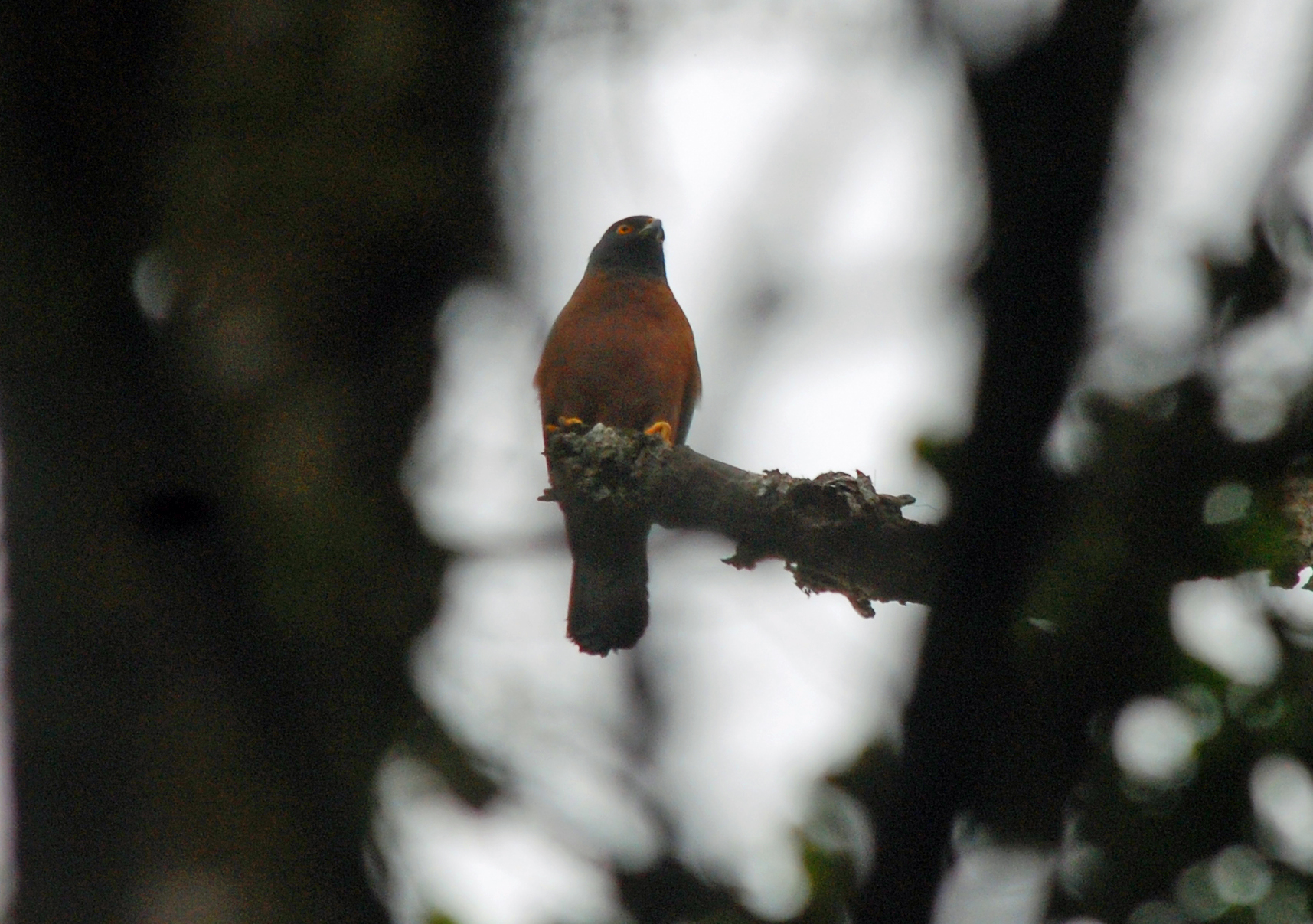

Conservation status
- Least Concern (IUCN 3.1)

Scientific classification
- Kingdom: Animalia
- Phylum: Chordata
- Class: Aves
- Order: Accipitriformes
- Family: Accipitridae
- Genus: Tachyspiza
- Species: T. melanochlamys

Binomial name
- Tachyspiza melanochlamys (Salvadori, 1876)

Synonyms
- Urospizias melanochlamys Salvadori, 1876; Astur melanochlamys schistacinus Rothschild & Hartert, 1913

= Black-mantled goshawk =

Species of bird

The black-mantled goshawk (Tachyspiza melanochlamys) is a species of bird of prey in the family Accipitridae. It is found in the highlands of New Guinea. Its natural habitat is subtropical or tropical moist lowland forests. This species was formerly placed in the genus Accipiter.

The black-mantled goshawk was figured in John Gould's The Birds of New Guinea and the Adjacent Papuan Islands, where it was placed in the genus Astur. The plate was prepared by William Matthew Hart.

== Taxonomy ==
The black-mantled goshawk was formally described in 1876 by the Italian zoologist Tommaso Salvadori based on a specimen collected in the Arfak Mountains of western New Guinea. He coined the binomial name Urospizias melanochlamys. This species was formerly placed in the genus Accipiter. In 2024 a comprehensive molecular phylogenetic study of the Accipitridae confirmed earlier work that had shown that the genus was polyphyletic. To resolve the non-monophyly, Accipiter was divided into six genera. The genus Tachyspiza was resurrected to accommodate the black-mantled goshawk together with 26 other species that had previously been placed in Accipiter. The resurrected genus had been introduced in 1844 by the German naturalist Johann Jakob Kaup. The genus name combines the Ancient Greek ταχυς (takhus) meaning "fast" with σπιζιας (spizias) meaning "hawk". The specific epithet melanochlamys combines the Ancient Greek μελας (melas), μελανος (melanos) meaning "black" with χλαμυς (khlamus), χλαμυδος (khlamudos) meaning "cloak" or "mantle".

This species has been treated as polytypic; however, the more recent contention is that it is monotypic, following Bruce Beehler and Thane Pratt. The form schistacinus was described from Mount Goliath by Walter Rothschild and Ernst Hartert in 1913. They described this subspecies as being distinct from the nominate in "the black of the upperside, including wings and tail, having a decided greyish wash or bloom, so that, instead of being glossy black, the upper surface is slaty black, and the collar, and especially the underside, is distinctly paler, more cinnamon-chestnut than rufous-chestnut." Beehler & Pratt wrote that they did "not think this minor clinal distinction merits recognition."
