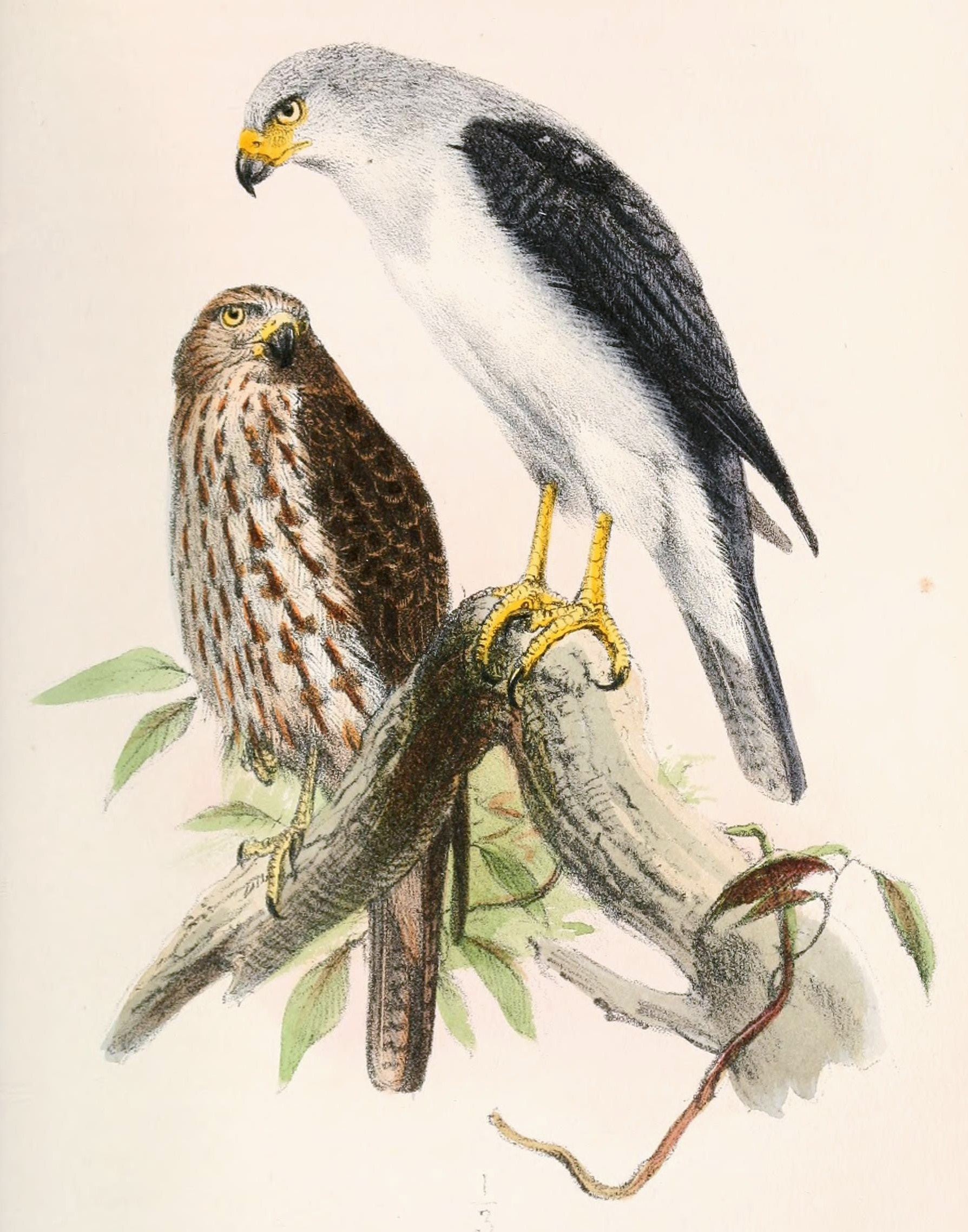

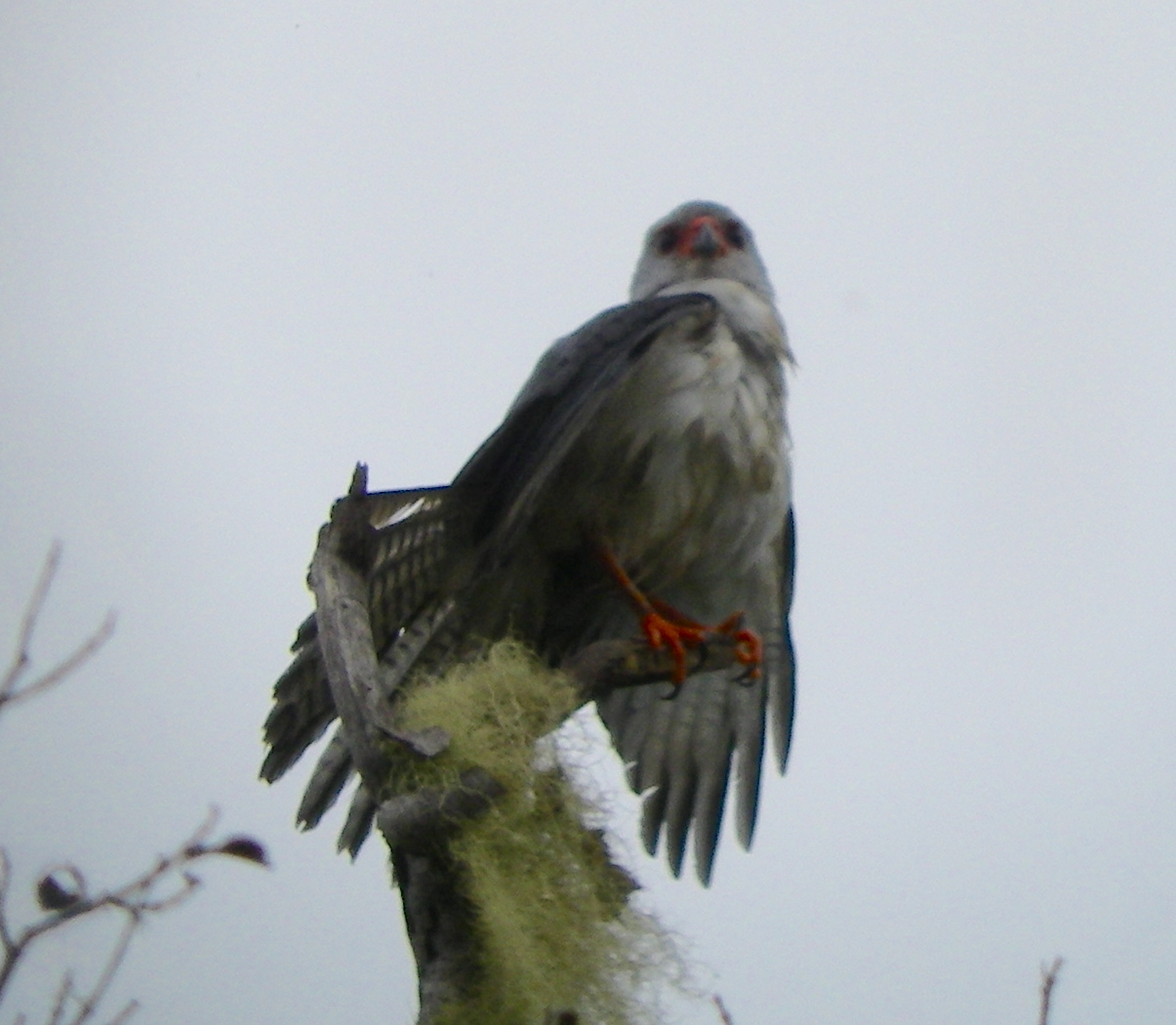

Conservation status
- Least Concern (IUCN 3.1)

Scientific classification
- Kingdom: Animalia
- Phylum: Chordata
- Class: Aves
- Order: Accipitriformes
- Family: Accipitridae
- Genus: Tachyspiza
- Species: T. poliocephala

Binomial name
- Tachyspiza poliocephala (Gray, GR, 1858)

= Grey-headed goshawk =

Species of bird

The grey-headed goshawk (Tachyspiza poliocephala) is a lightly built, medium-sized bird of prey in the family Accipitridae. This species was formerly placed in the genus Accipiter.

== Description ==
The upperparts are grey, paler on the head and neck; the wings are dark; the underparts are mainly white; the cere and legs are red-orange. The body is 30–38 cm long; females are larger than males. Juveniles have dark brown wings.

== Distribution and habitat ==
The grey-headed goshawk is endemic to New Guinea and adjacent islands. It has been recorded from Saibai Island, Queensland, an Australian territory in the north-western Torres Strait. It lives in forests, forest edges and secondary growth.

== Breeding ==
This species nests in tall trees on a platform of sticks and leaves.

== Feeding ==
It eats small reptiles and insects.
