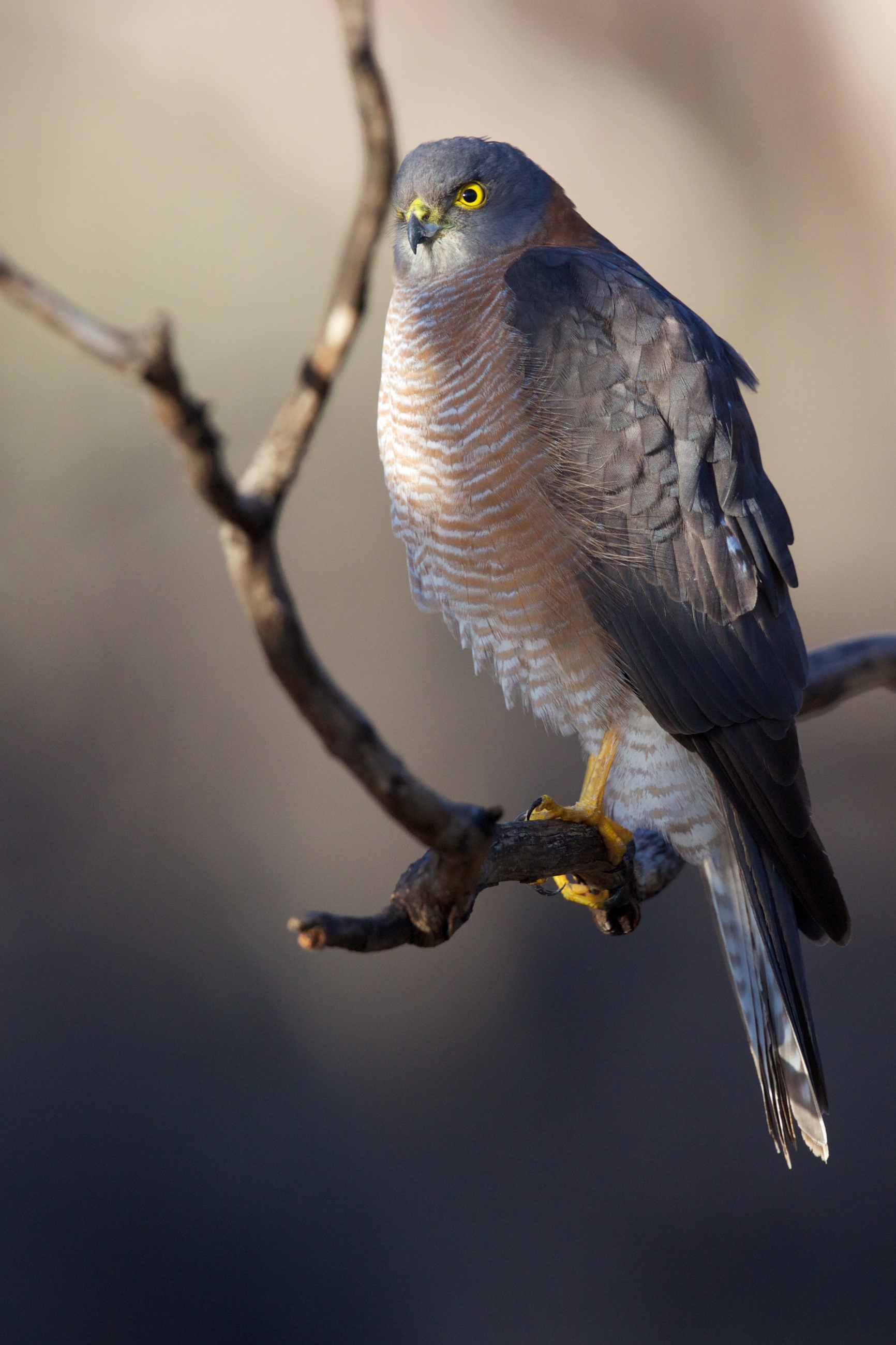

Conservation status
- Least Concern (IUCN 3.1)

Scientific classification
- Kingdom: Animalia
- Phylum: Chordata
- Class: Aves
- Order: Accipitriformes
- Family: Accipitridae
- Genus: Tachyspiza
- Species: T. cirrocephala

Binomial name
- Tachyspiza cirrocephala (Vieillot, 1817)

Subspecies
- T. c. papuana - (Rothschild & Hartert, 1913); T. c. cirrocephala - (Vieillot, 1817)

= Collared sparrowhawk =

Species of bird

The collared sparrowhawk (Tachyspiza cirrocephala) is a small, slim bird of prey in the family Accipitridae found in Australia, New Guinea and nearby smaller islands. It was formerly placed in the genus Accipiter. As its name implies the collared sparrowhawk is a specialist in hunting small birds. It is characterised by its slight brow ridges and slender feet. The last segment of their middle toe projects beyond the claws of the other toes.

== Taxonomy ==
The collared sparrowhawk was formally described in 1817 by the French ornithologist Louis Vieillot based on a specimen that had been collected in "Nouvelle-Hollande", now the state of New South Wales in eastern Australia. Vieillot coined the binomial name Sparvius cirrocephalus. The specific epithet combines the Modern Latin cirrus or cirrhus meaning 'cloud' with the Latin cirrus, cirri meaning 'ringlet'. This species was formerly placed in the genus Accipiter. In 2024 a comprehensive molecular phylogenetic study of the Accipitridae confirmed earlier work that had shown that the genus was polyphyletic. To resolve the non-monophyly, Accipiter was divided into six genera. The genus Tachyspiza was resurrected to accommodate the collared sparrowhawk together with 26 other species that had previously been placed in Accipiter. The resurrected genus had been introduced in 1844 by the German naturalist Johann Jakob Kaup. The genus name combines the Ancient Greek ταχυς (takhus) meaning 'fast' with σπιζιας (spizias) meaning 'hawk'.

Two subspecies are recognised:

- T. c. papuana (Rothschild & Hartert, EJO, 1913) – New Guinea and satellites
- T. c. cirrocephala (Vieillot, 1817) – Australia

== Description ==
The collared sparrowhawk is 29–38 cm (tail about half), with a wingspan 55–78 cm, the average male weighs 126 g, female 218 g. They are small, fierce, finely built with rounded wings, long square tail, yellow eyes and long legs. Adults have slate-grey upper parts, sometimes with a brown wash, and a chestnut half collar. The underparts are finely barred rufous and white. The under wing and tail are finely barred. The cere is cream to olive-yellow, the eyes yellow and the legs and feet yellow. The sexes are similar in appearance but males are smaller than females. Juveniles have brown upper parts, with pale streaks on the head and nape, and fine rufous edges to the feathers of the back and wings. The under parts are white with heavy brown streaks on the breast and coarse brown barring on the belly. The underwings and tail are finely barred. The cere is cream to greenish yellow, the eyes brown to pale yellow and legs and feet pale yellow.

== Distribution and habitat ==
The collared sparrowhawk is widespread through mainland Australia, Tasmania and New Guinea and is found in all habitats except the driest deserts. It can occasionally be seen in urban areas and even cities. Although widespread, they are generally uncommon. Collared sparrowhawks are generally resident but may be partly migratory, however their movements are poorly known.

== Behaviour ==
=== Food and feeding ===
The collared sparrowhawk mainly eats small birds, the crested pigeon and spotted bowerbird are the largest birds that sparrowhawks have been recorded taking. They also catch insects, lizards and small mammals (including small bats). Sparrowhawks rely on stealth and surprise to catch their prey, hunting in flight or bursting from a concealed perch among foliage. Most prey weighs less than 100 g and sometimes over 200 g. It forages by short-stay perch hunting from a concealed position in foliage, punctuated by short tree-to-tree, often undulating flights. It also forages by low fast flight, sometimes hedge hopping. Prey is seized in flight by a direct flying attack or a stealthy glide.

=== Breeding ===
The laying season is July to December. Pairs nest solitarily. The nest is a platform of sticks 27–32 cm across, 12–15 cm deep, lined with green leaves around 4–39 m above ground in the fork of a living tree. The clutch size is usually three or four eggs, ranging from two to five. Incubation takes 35 days, and the nesting period is about 28–33 days. The period of dependence after fledging lasts up to 6 weeks, after which young disperse. Sexual maturity is reached at one year, with birds sometimes breeding in juvenile plumage.

Kobble Creek, SE Queensland, Australia

== Threats and conservation ==
The collared sparrowhawk is not globally or nationally threatened. It is widespread and generally uncommon, but may be common in forests in the tropics and subtropics; it is also secretive and most likely under-recorded. It has undergone declines in extensively cleared areas. It is thought that their loss of numbers is due to the use of DDT which has reduced the thickness of collared sparrowhawks' eggs by 2%, and the increase of the pied currawong (Strepera graculina) a predator and competitor capable of robbing and injuring adults and killing nestlings.
