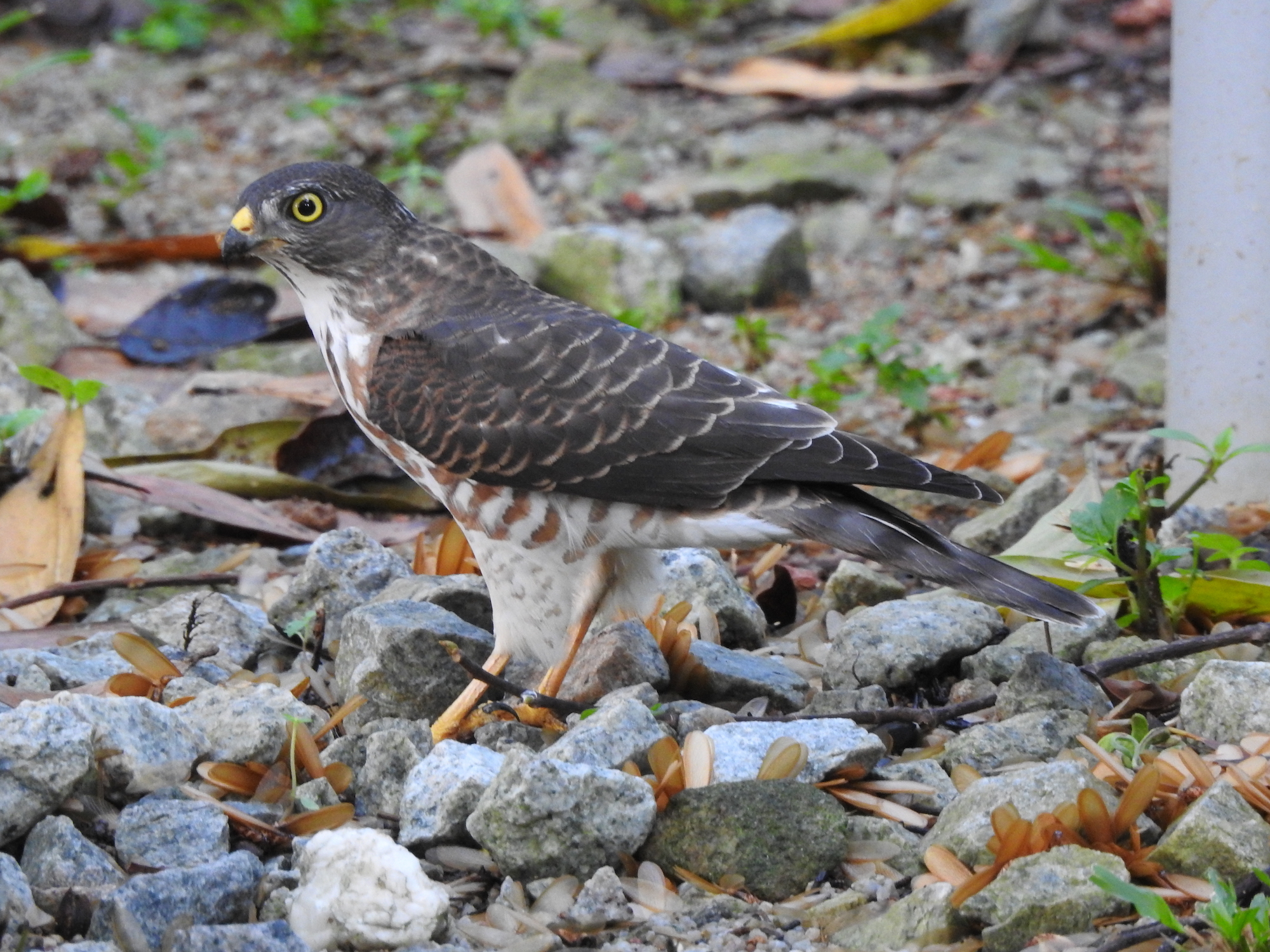

Conservation status
- Least Concern (IUCN 3.1)

Scientific classification
- Kingdom: Animalia
- Phylum: Chordata
- Class: Aves
- Order: Accipitriformes
- Family: Accipitridae
- Genus: Tachyspiza
- Species: T. soloensis

Binomial name
- Tachyspiza soloensis (Horsfield, 1821)

= Chinese sparrowhawk =

Species of bird

The Chinese sparrowhawk (Tachyspiza soloensis) is a bird of prey in the family Accipitridae. This species was formerly placed in the genus Accipiter.

== Taxonomy ==
The Chinese sparrowhawk was formally described in 1821 by the American naturalist Thomas Horsfield under the binomial name Falco soloensis. Horsfield designated the type locality as the Solo River, on the Indonesian island of Java. This species was formerly placed in the large and diverse genus Accipiter. In 2024 a comprehensive molecular phylogenetic study of the Accipitridae confirmed earlier work that had shown that the genus was polyphyletic. To resolve the non-monophyly, Accipiter was divided into six genera. The genus Tachyspiza was resurrected to accommodate the Chinese sparrowhawk and 26 other species that had previously been placed in Accipiter. The resurrected genus had been introduced in 1844 by the German naturalist Johann Jakob Kaup. The species is monotypic: no subspecies are recognised. The genus name combines the Ancient Greek ταχυς (takhus) meaning "fast" with σπιζιας (spizias) meaning "hawk".

== Description ==
It is 30–36 cm in length, with the female larger than the male. Adults have prominent black wing tips. The male is grey above, white below and has red eyes. The female has rufous on breast and underwing coverts, and yellow eyes. Juveniles have a grey face, brown upperparts and yellow eyes. The top underparts are streaked, while the thighs are barred. The black wing tips are not as prominent and underwings streaked (except for coverts).

== Distribution and habitat ==
It breeds in Southeast China, Taiwan, Korea and Siberia; winters in Indonesia and Philippines, passing through the rest of Southeast Asia. It lives mainly in forests but sometimes lives on edges. It sometimes migrates in small groups.

== Diet ==
In its breeding range, it feeds mainly on frogs, but will take lizards and other small invertebrates as well. It occasionally eats small birds and mice. In its wintering range, this species feeds heavily on cicadas.
