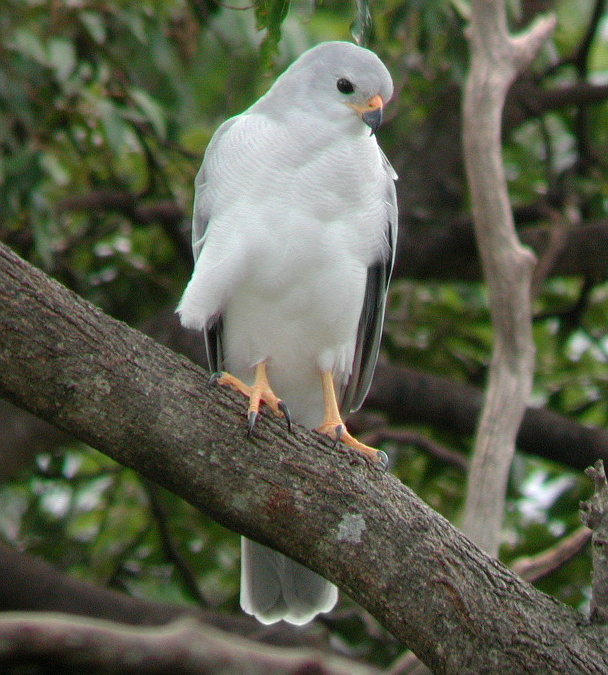

Conservation status
- Least Concern (IUCN 3.1)

Scientific classification
- Kingdom: Animalia
- Phylum: Chordata
- Class: Aves
- Order: Accipitriformes
- Family: Accipitridae
- Genus: Tachyspiza
- Species: T. novaehollandiae

Binomial name
- Tachyspiza novaehollandiae (Gmelin, JF, 1788)

= Grey goshawk =

Species of bird of prey in the family Accipitridae

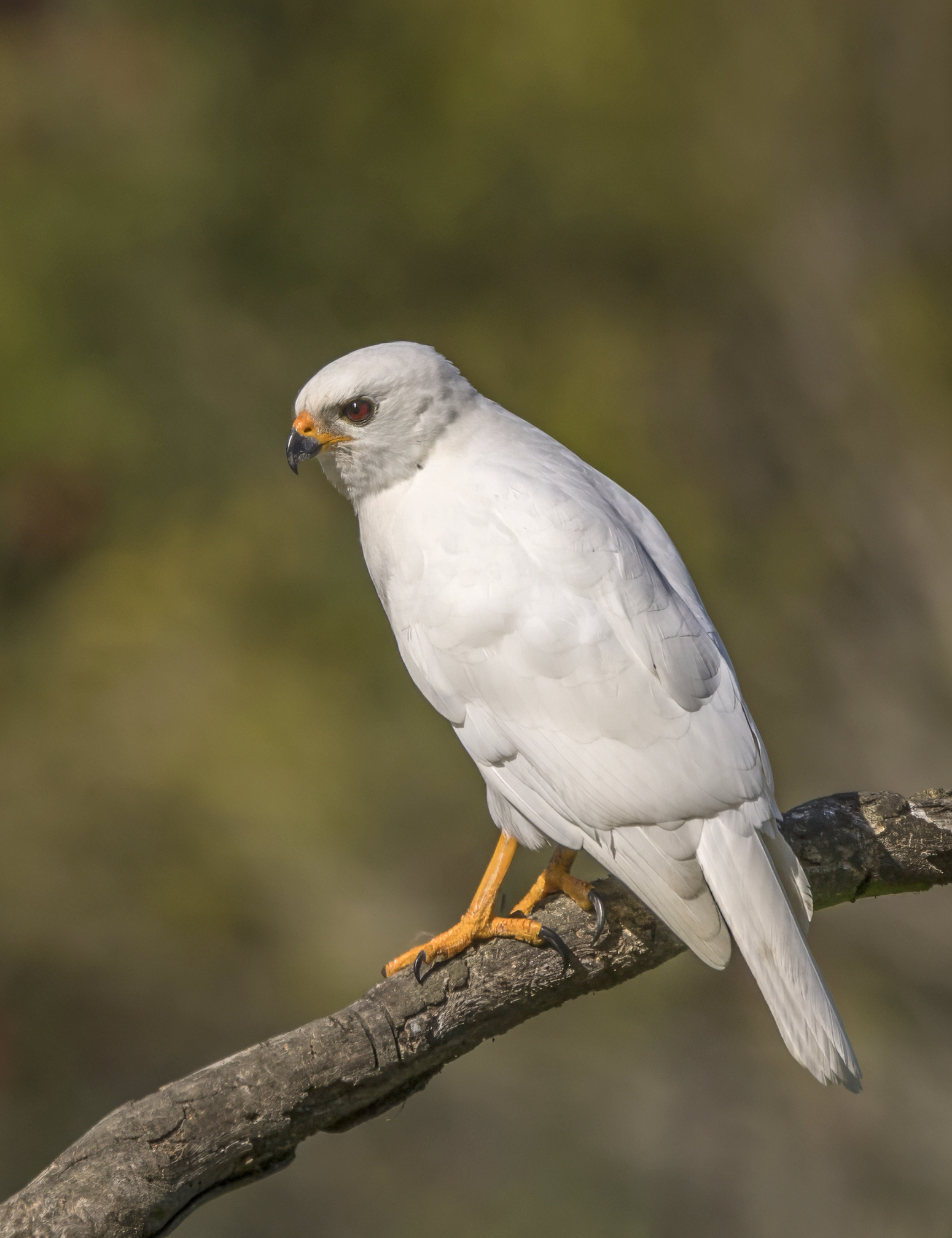
White morph

The grey goshawk (Tachyspiza novaehollandiae) is a strongly built, medium-sized bird of prey in the family Accipitridae that is found in eastern and northern Australia. The white morph of this species is known as the white goshawk. This species was formerly placed in the genus Accipiter.

== Taxonomy ==
The grey goshawk was formally described in 1788 by the German naturalist Johann Friedrich Gmelin in his revised and expanded edition of Carl Linnaeus's Systema Naturae. He placed it with the eagles, hawks and relatives in the genus Falco and coined the binomial name Falco novaehollandiae. Gmelin based his description on the "New Holland white eagle" that had been described in 1781 by the English ornithologist John Latham. Latham in turn had based his short description on information provided by Johann Forster who had accompanied James Cook on his second voyage to the Pacific Ocean. Two specimens had been collected in March 1773 at Adventure Bay in Tasmania.

The grey goshawk was formerly placed in the genus Accipiter. In 2024 a comprehensive molecular phylogenetic study of the Accipitridae confirmed earlier work that had shown that the genus was polyphyletic. To resolve the non-monophyly, Accipiter was divided into six genera. The genus Tachyspiza was resurrected to accommodate the grey goshawk together with 26 other species that had previously been placed in Accipiter. The resurrected genus had been introduced in 1844 by the German naturalist Johann Jakob Kaup. The genus name combines the Ancient Greek ταχυς (takhus) meaning "fast" with σπιζιας (spizias) meaning "hawk". The specific epithet novaehollandiae is Modern Latin for "New Holland", the name given to western Australia by early Dutch explorers. In ornithology the name is used for eastern Australia, especially New South Wales.

== Description ==
The grey morph has a pale grey head and back, dark wingtips, barred grey breast and tail, and white underparts. The white morphs of this species and the closely related variable goshawk are the only birds of prey in the world to be entirely white.

Grey goshawks are the largest Tachyspiza on mainland Australia, at about 40 to 55 cm (16 to 22 in) long, with wingspans of 70 to 110 cm (28 to 43 in). Females are much larger than males, weighing about 720 g (1.59 lb) on average (and sometimes scaling up to 990 g (2.18 lb)) while males average 355 g (12.5 oz).

== Distribution and habitat ==
The grey goshawk is found along the coasts of northern, eastern and south-eastern Australia, Tasmania and rarely Western Australia. It was formerly considered conspecific with the variable goshawk.

Their preferred habitats are forests, tall woodlands, and timbered watercourses.

== Behaviour and ecology ==
=== Food and feeding ===
Grey goshawks often seem to vary their prey selection opportunistically. For an Accipiter, they relatively often select mammals such as rabbits, possums, echidnas, and bats. Other prey can include small reptiles, amphibians, insects, and other arthropods, as well as occasionally carrion. However, the most frequent prey type are most often birds. Evidence from different parts of the range shows females select larger prey than males, with males largely keeping to small to mid-sized passerines while females often prey on larger prey such as currawongs, gamebirds (including megapodes), poultry, and even herons. Pigeons and parrots are a popular prey item for grey goshawks. Evidence indicates that this species is less agile in the air and less skilled at twisting pursuits over the ground than co-occurring brown goshawks but, on the other hand, the grey species is more powerful and so select typically larger prey.

Hunting is often done by stealth, but grey goshawks are willing to pursue their prey before catching it with their talons.

=== Breeding ===
Grey and white goshawks interbreed freely. They partner for life, breeding from July to December. They nest in tall trees on a platform of sticks and twigs with a central depression lined with green leaves. The female lays a clutch containing 2 or 3 eggs, which are incubated for about 35 days. Chicks fledge 35–40 days after hatching.

The female is usually responsible for incubating the eggs and feeding the young. The male does most of the hunting.

== Conservation status ==
State of Tasmania

- This species is "endangered" in Tasmania.

State of Victoria (Australia)

- The grey goshawk is listed as "threatened" on the Victorian Flora and Fauna Guarantee Act 1988. Under this Act, an "Action Statement" for the recovery and future management of this species has not been prepared.
- On the 2007 advisory list of threatened vertebrate fauna in Victoria, this species is listed as vulnerable.

State of Queensland

- This species is listed as "least concern" in Queensland.

== Gallery ==
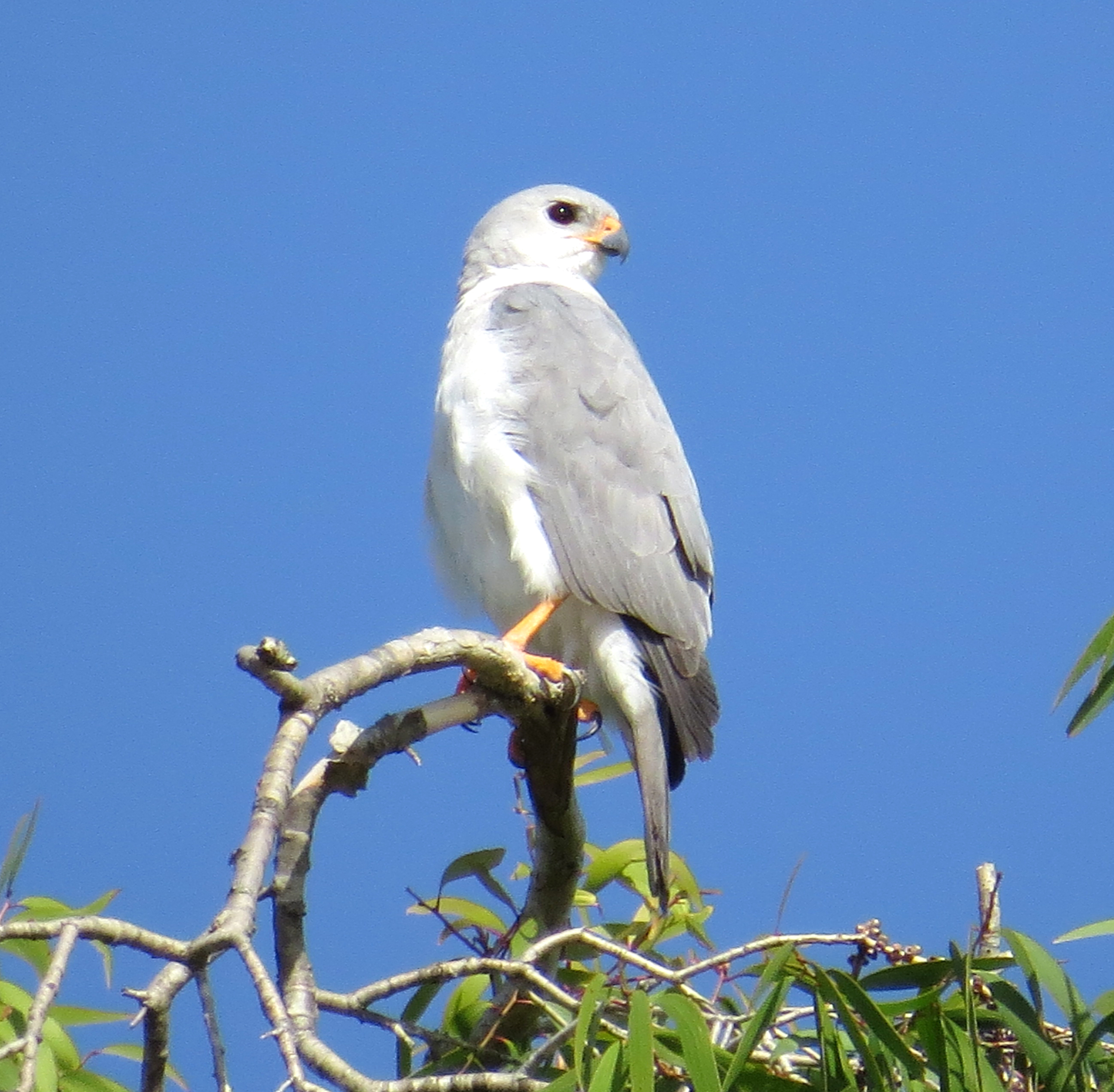

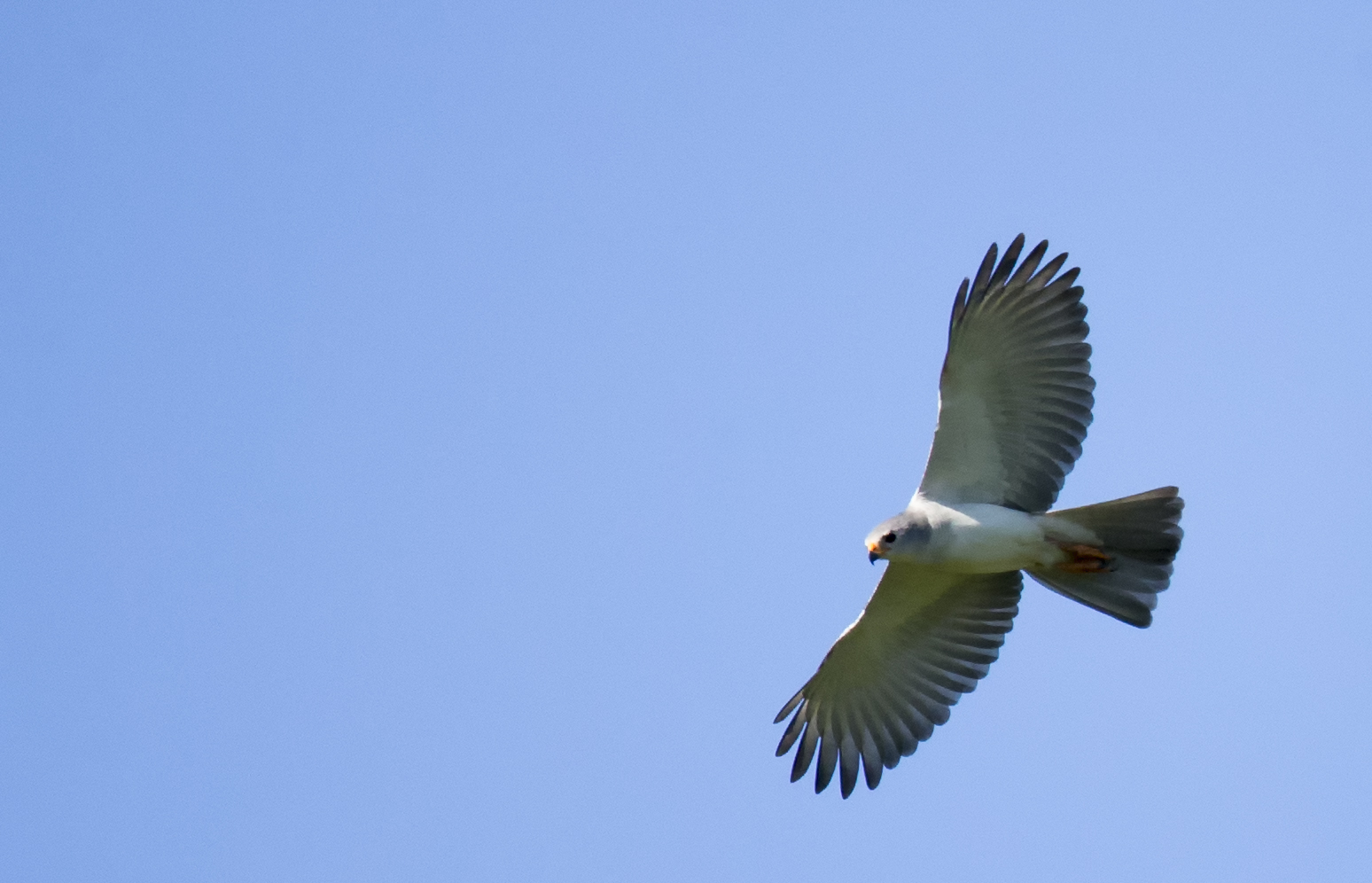
