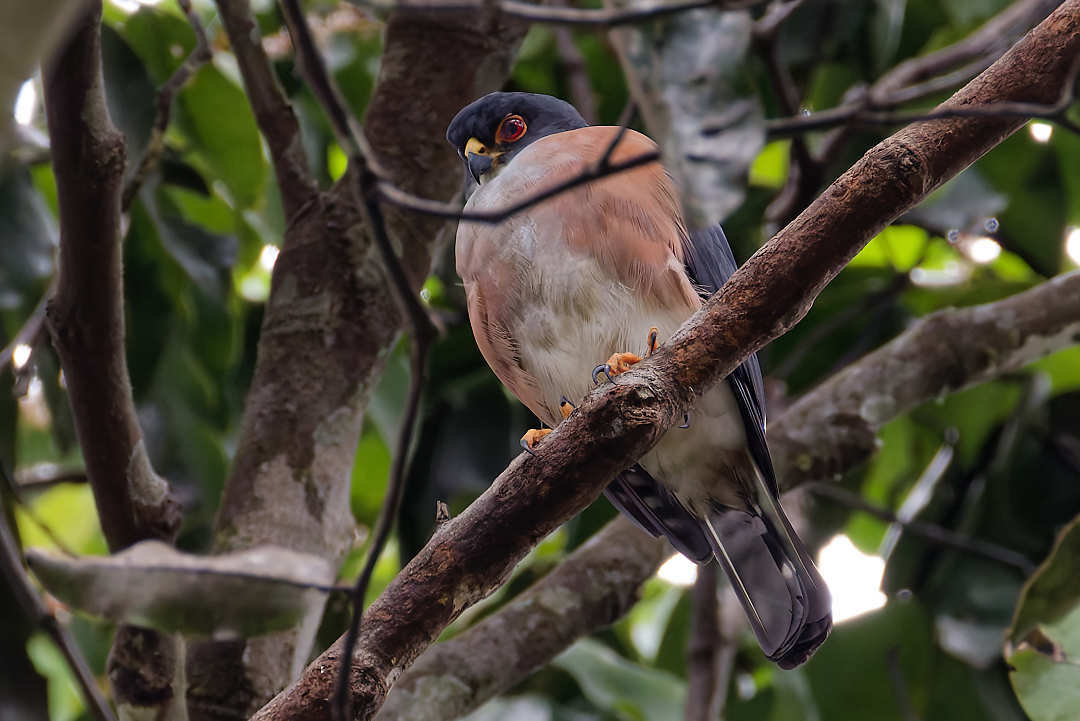

Conservation status
- Least Concern (IUCN 3.1)

Scientific classification
- Kingdom: Animalia
- Phylum: Chordata
- Class: Aves
- Order: Accipitriformes
- Family: Accipitridae
- Genus: Tachyspiza
- Species: T. erythropus

Binomial name
- Tachyspiza erythropus (Hartlaub, 1855)

Subspecies
- T. e. erythropus - (Hartlaub, 1855); T. e. zenkeri - (Reichenow, 1894)

Synonyms
- Nisus erythropus Hartlaub, 1855

= Red-thighed sparrowhawk =

Species of bird

The red-thighed sparrowhawk (Tachyspiza erythropus), alternatively known as the red-legged sparrowhawk or western little sparrowhawk, is a species of sparrowhawk in the family Accipitridae from western and northern central Africa. This species was formerly placed in the genus Accipiter.

== Taxonomy ==
The red-thighed sparrowhawk was formally described in 1885 by the German ornithologist Gustav Hartlaub based on a specimen collected in "Rio Bontry", now Butre on the coast of Ghana. He coined the binomial name "Nisus erythropus". The species was formerly placed in the genus Accipiter. In 2024 a comprehensive molecular phylogenetic study of the Accipitridae confirmed earlier work that had shown that the genus was polyphyletic. To resolve the non-monophyly, Accipiter was divided into six genera. The genus Tachyspiza was resurrected to accommodate the red-thighed sparrowhawk together with 26 other species that had previously been placed in Accipiter. The resurrected genus had been introduced in 1844 by the German naturalist Johann Jakob Kaup. The genus name combines the Ancient Greek ταχυς (takhus) meaning "fast" with σπιζιας (spizias) meaning "hawk". The specific epithet erythropus combines Ancient Greek ερυθρος (eruthros) meaning "red" with πους (pous), ποδος (podos) meaning "foot".

Two subspecies are recognised:

- Tachyspiza erythropus erythropus (Hartlaub, 1855) – Senegal and Gambia to Nigeria
- Tachyspiza erythropus zenkeri (Reichenow, 1894) – Cameroon to west Uganda and north Angola

== Description ==
A very small, dove-sized sparrowhawk with a distinctive tail pattern. The red-thighed sparrowhawk is sexually dimorphic, the males of the nominate subspecies having very dark grey upperparts with a white crescent on the lower rump which is conspicuous in flight, as are three white broken tail bars on the dark grey tail. In contrast to the blackish cheeks the throat is white with the rest of the underparts pinkish white. The vermilion eye is surrounded by a red eye ring, the cere is orange red and the legs are bright orange yellow. Males of the subspecies A.e. zenkeri have deep rufous underparts and more obvious white spots on the tail. Females are much bigger than the males, with browner upperparts and a more brownish orange eye. Juveniles normally have the underparts barred with brown, sometimes up to the breast. The body length is 23–28 cm (9.1–11.0 in) and the wingspan is 40 cm (16 in).

== Distribution and habitat ==
The red-thighed sparrowhawk is found in lowland primary rainforest, along the forest edges and in clearings, as well as in older secondary forest.

== Behaviour ==
The red-thighed sparrowhawk is a secretive and crepuscular species that spends most of the day perched in the interior of the forest. Its main prey is small birds up to the size of pigeons as well as lizards, amphibians, and insects. Prey is captured in quick dashes from a perch in the forest understory. This species often hunts co-operatively in pairs to harass mixed-species bird flocks.

The breeding behaviour is little known but it does build a small stick nest in the fork of a tree, the only record being a family of five recorded in Liberia in December 1996.
