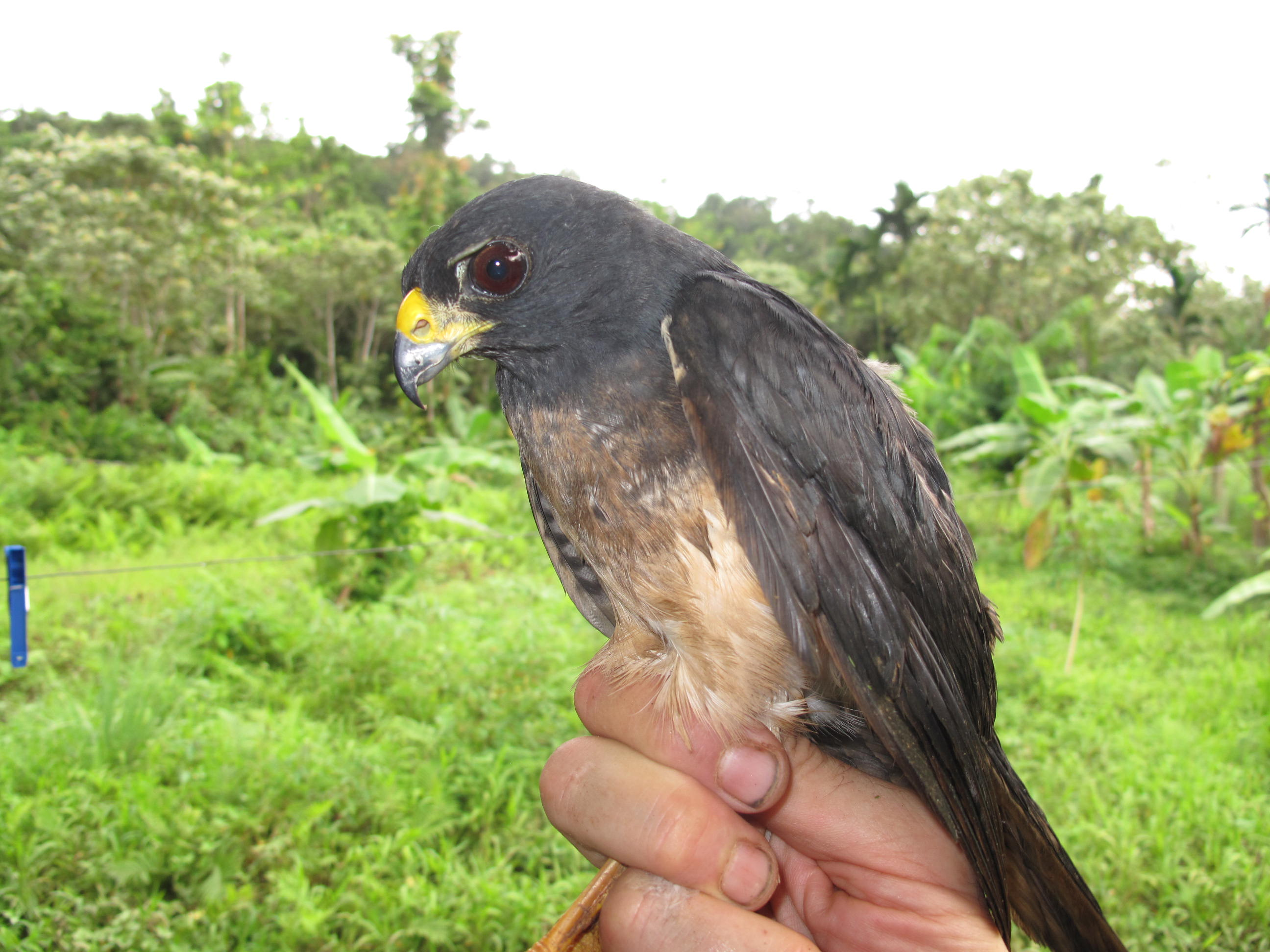

Conservation status
- Near Threatened (IUCN 3.1)

Scientific classification
- Kingdom: Animalia
- Phylum: Chordata
- Class: Aves
- Order: Accipitriformes
- Family: Accipitridae
- Genus: Tachyspiza
- Species: T. imitator

Binomial name
- Tachyspiza imitator (Hartert, EJO, 1926)

= Imitator goshawk =

Species of bird

The imitator goshawk or imitator sparrowhawk (Tachyspiza imitator) is a species of bird of prey in the family Accipitridae. It was formerly placed in the genus Accipiter. It is found on the islands of Bougainville, Choiseul and Santa Isabel in the Solomon Islands archipelago. Its natural habitats are subtropical or tropical moist lowland forest and subtropical or tropical moist montane forest.

It is threatened by habitat loss.

== Description ==
It has a length of 26-33 cm and a wingspan of 53-63 cm. Regarding mass, one male weighed 208 grams and two females weighed 225 and 250 grams, respectively.

== See also ==
- Accipitridae
- Accipiter
- Bird of prey
- List of birds of the Solomon Islands
- Solomon Islands archipelago
