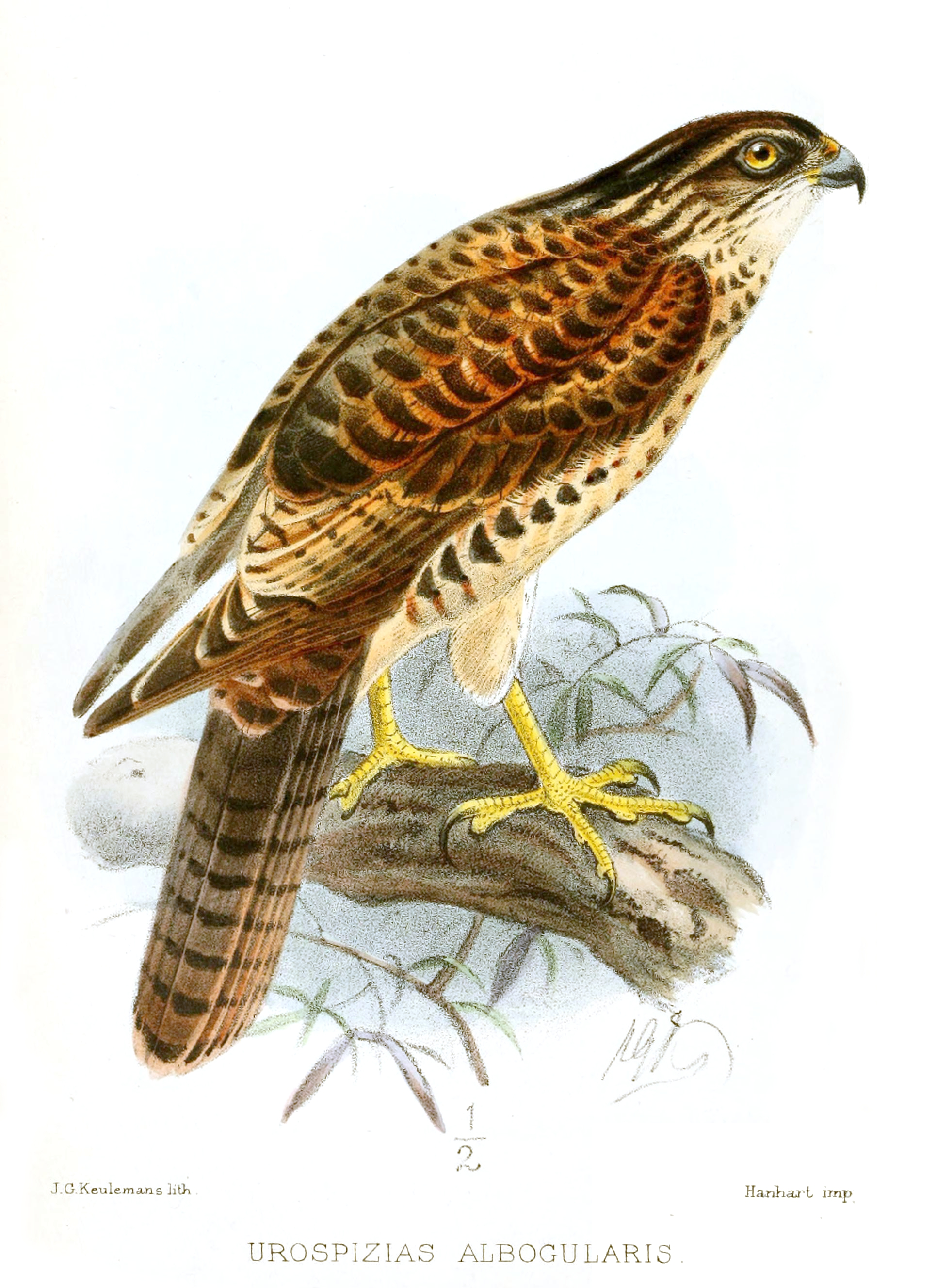

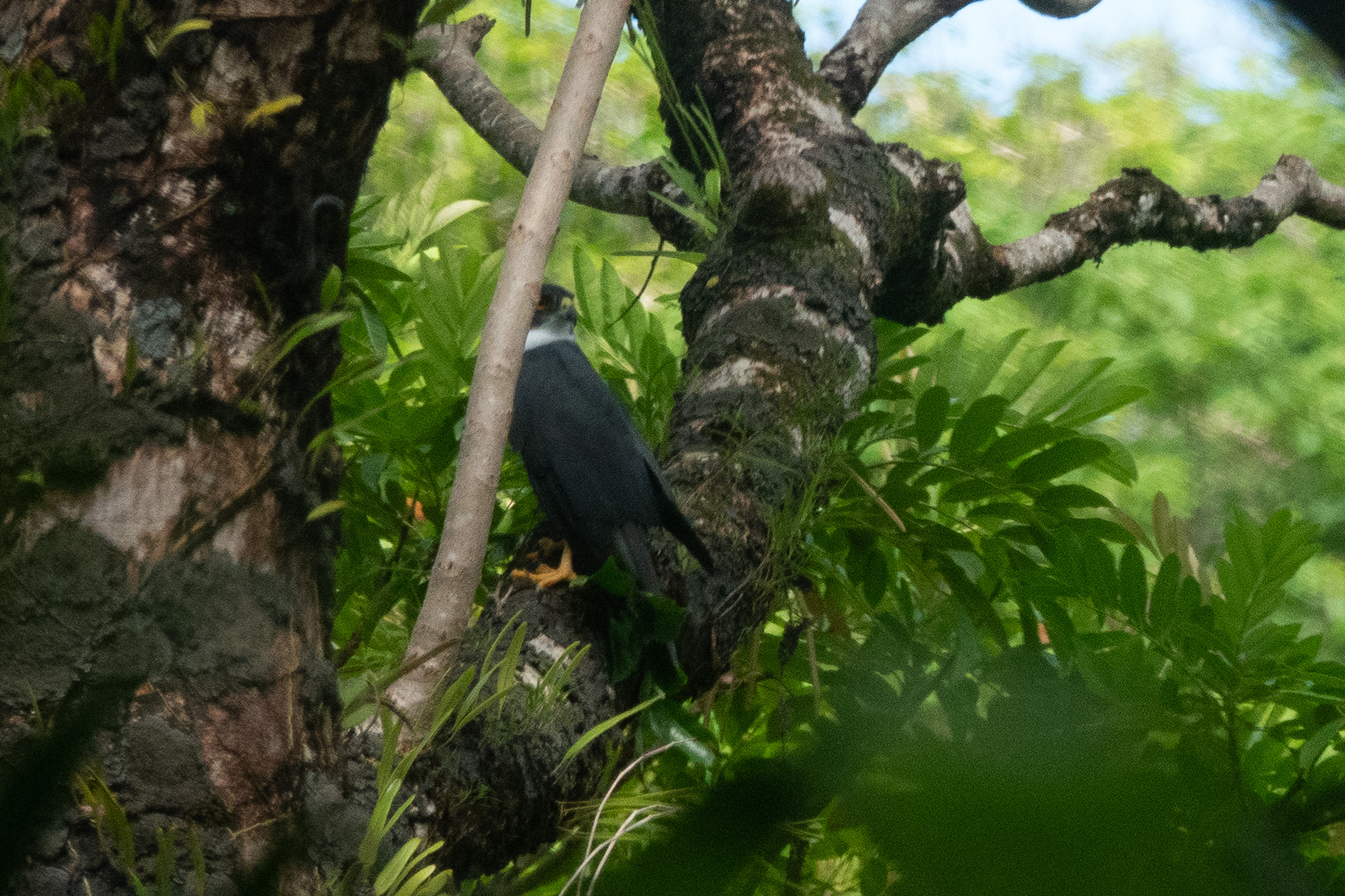

Conservation status
- Least Concern (IUCN 3.1)

Scientific classification
- Kingdom: Animalia
- Phylum: Chordata
- Class: Aves
- Order: Accipitriformes
- Family: Accipitridae
- Genus: Tachyspiza
- Species: T. albogularis

Binomial name
- Tachyspiza albogularis (Gray, GR, 1870)

Subspecies
- T. a. eichhorni - (Hartert, 1926); T. a. woodfordi - (Sharpe, 1888); T. a. gilvus - (Mayr, 1945); T. a. albogularis - (Gray, GR, 1870); T. a. sharpei - (Oustalet, 1875)
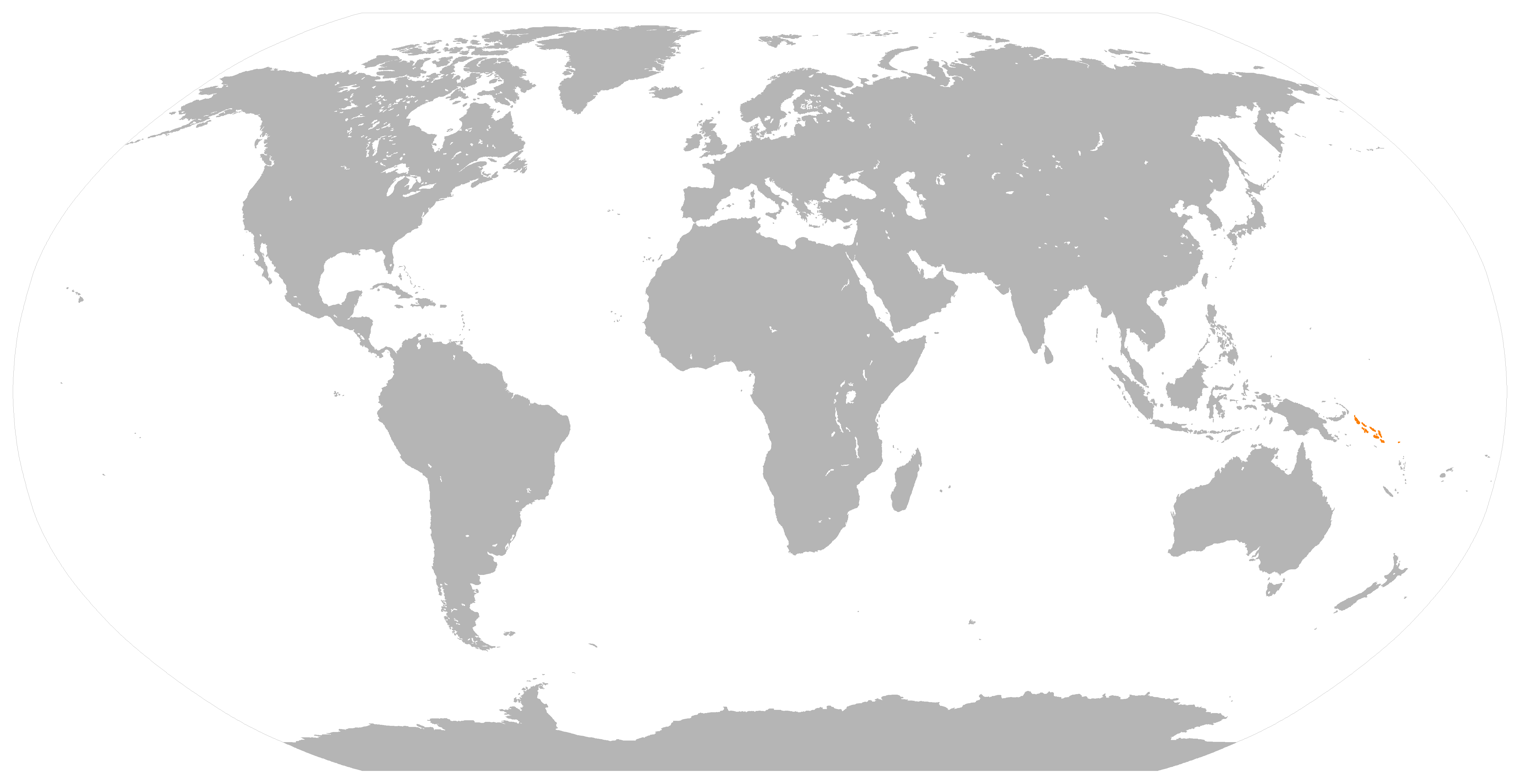

= Pied goshawk =

Species of bird

The pied goshawk (Tachyspiza albogularis) is a species of bird of prey in the family Accipitridae. It is found on Bougainville Island and the Solomon Islands. Its natural habitats are subtropical or tropical moist lowland forest and subtropical or tropical moist montane forest. This species was formerly placed in the genus Accipiter.

== Taxonomy ==
Five subspecies are recognised:

- T. a. eichhorni (Hartert, EJO, 1926) – Feni Islands (east of southeast New Ireland, northeast Bismarck Archipelago)
- T. a. woodfordi (Sharpe, 1888) – Buka to Malaita and Ulawa (north of Makira; north to central south Solomon Islands, except New Georgia group)
- T. a. gilva (Mayr, 1945) – New Georgia group (central west Solomon Islands)
- T. a. albogularis (Gray, GR, 1870) – Makira and satellites (southeast Solomon Islands)
- T. a. sharpei (Oustalet, 1875) – Utupua and Vanikoro (Temotu=Santa Cruz Islands, southeast Solomon Islands)
