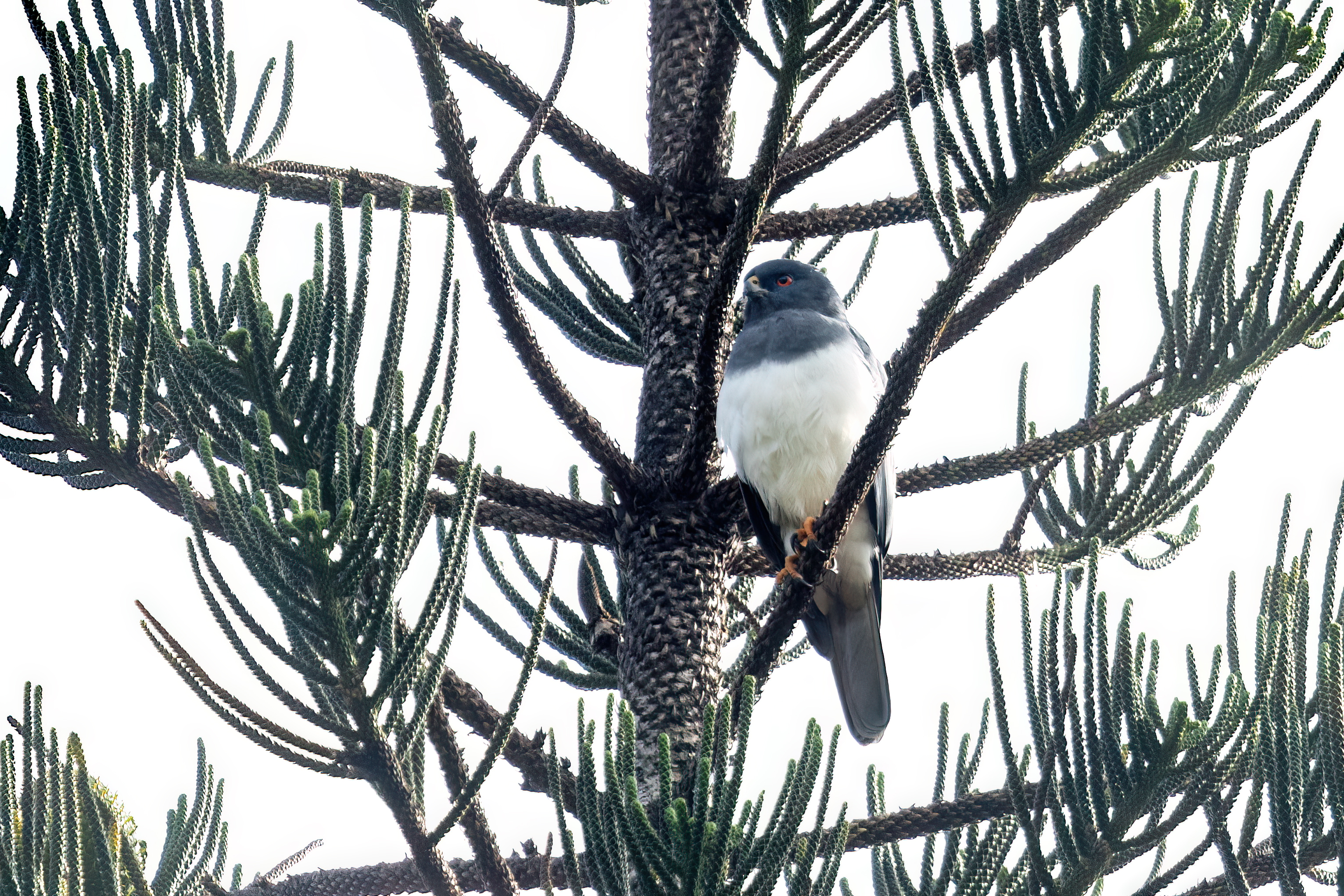
- Adult

Conservation status
- Near Threatened (IUCN 3.1)

Scientific classification
- Kingdom: Animalia
- Phylum: Chordata
- Class: Aves
- Order: Accipitriformes
- Family: Accipitridae
- Genus: Tachyspiza
- Species: T. haplochroa

Binomial name
- Tachyspiza haplochroa (Sclater, PL, 1859)
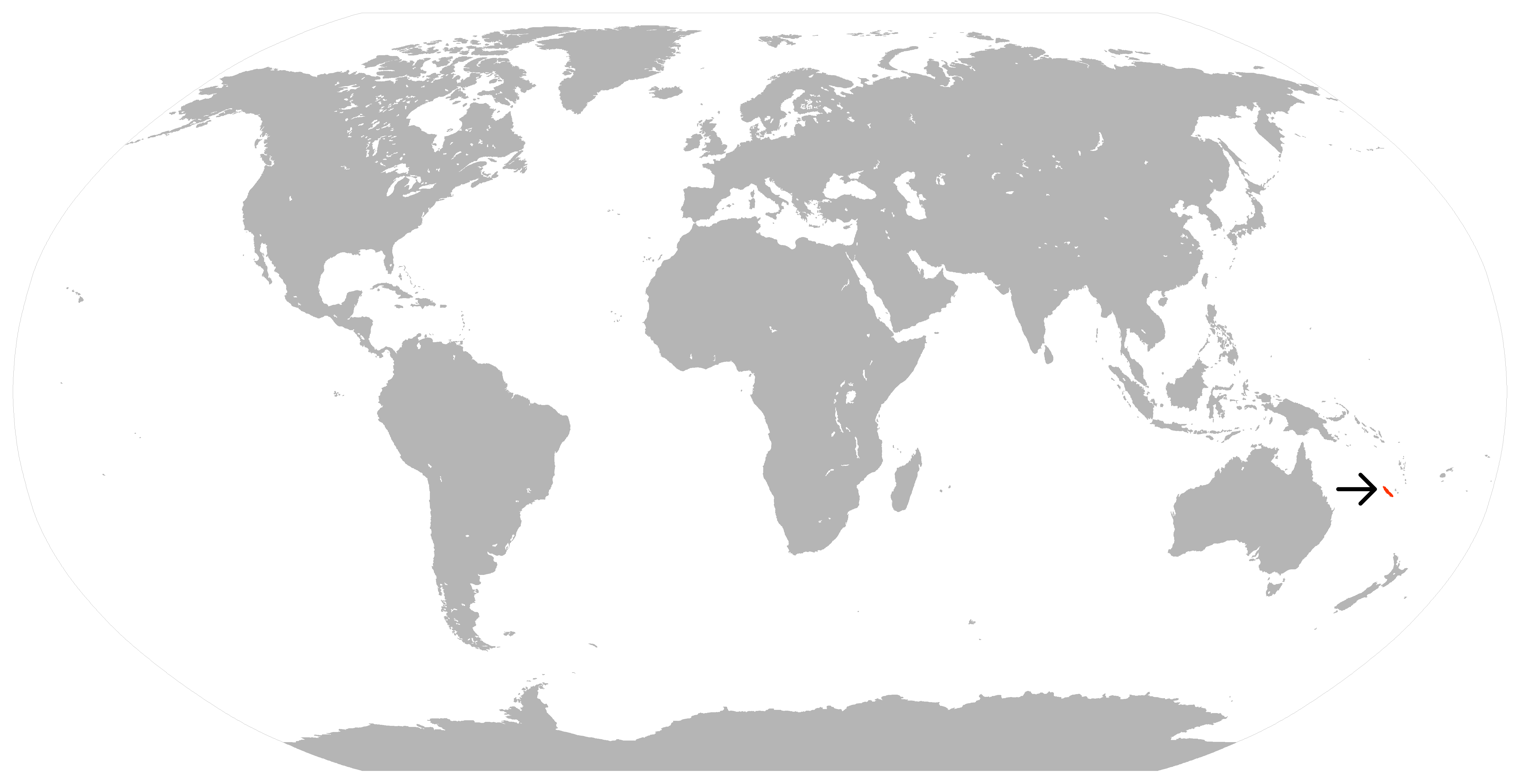

= White-bellied goshawk =

Species of bird

The white-bellied goshawk (Tachyspiza haplochroa) also known as the New Caledonia goshawk, white-bellied sparrowhawk, or katabeialek by locals is a species of bird of prey in the family Accipitridae. It is endemic to New Caledonia. This species was formerly placed in the genus Accipiter.

Its natural habitats are subtropical or tropical moist lowland forest, subtropical or tropical moist montane forest, dry savanna, and heavily degraded former forest. It is threatened by habitat loss.
