= Powerful goshawk =

Powerful goshawk Temporal range: Holocene

Conservation status
- Extinct

Scientific classification
- Kingdom: Animalia
- Phylum: Chordata
- Class: Aves
- Order: Accipitriformes
- Family: Accipitridae
- Genus: Tachyspiza
- Species: †T. efficax

Binomial name
- †Tachyspiza efficax Balouet & Olson, 1989

Extinct species of bird

The powerful goshawk (Tachyspiza efficax), also referred to as the greater New Caledonian goshawk, is an extinct species of bird of prey in the family Accipitridae. It was endemic to the island of New Caledonia in Melanesia in the southwest Pacific region. It was described from subfossil bones found at the Pindai Caves paleontological site on the west coast of Grande Terre. The Latin specific epithet efficax means "powerful".

== Description ==
It is an Accipiter of the A. gentilis group, recognizable by very large size and the proportionately short, very robust tarsometatarsus. This species differs from A. gentilis in proportions, the elements of the wing and pectoral girdle being smaller but the tarsometatarsus and claws as large and robust as in that species. Also, the distal foramen of the tarsometatarsus is markedly smaller and the wing of the inner trochlea does not extend as far posteriorly. Compared with A. meyerianus, the ulna is more robust, with a heavier olecranon; the tarsometatarsus is also more robust, especially in lateral view, the distal end is more expanded, the distal foramen smaller, and the posterior face of the shaft more excavated and channel-like.
