= Pindai Caves =

Caves in New Caledonia

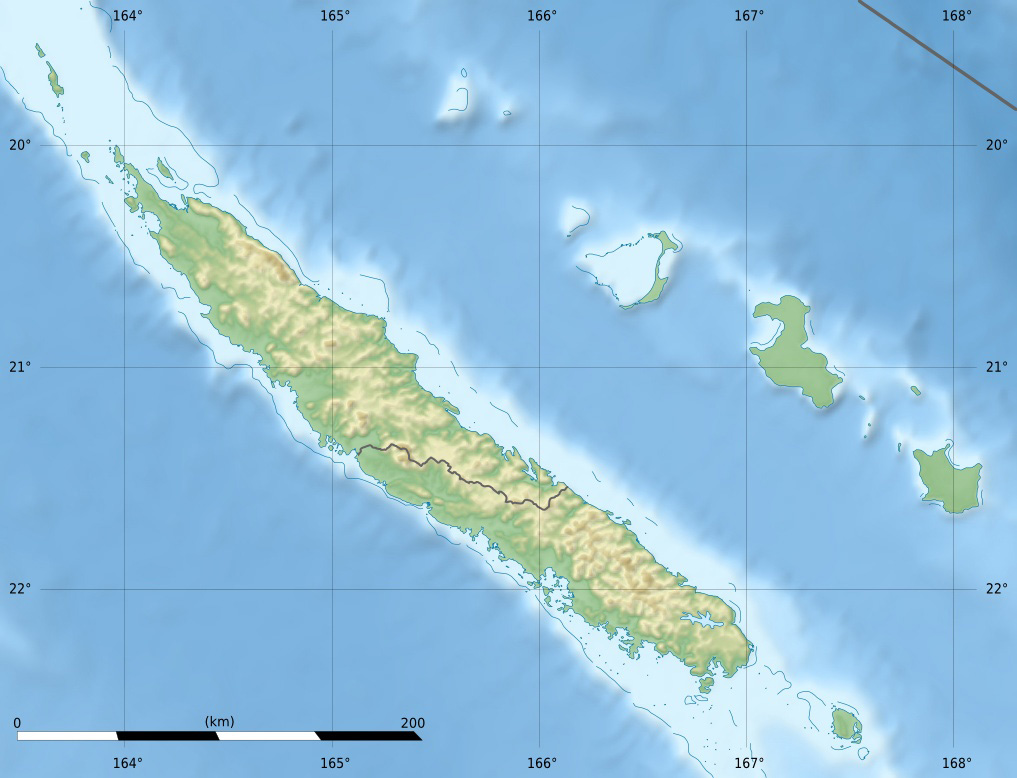
- location in New Caledonia
- 21°21′S 164°58′E
- Location: Népoui Peninsula, north-west coast of Grande Terre
- Region: New Caledonia

The Pindai Caves of New Caledonia are an archaeological and palaeontological site important for the study of prehistoric human settlement as well as of the Holocene fauna of the island. The Pindai area has been occupied by humans for varying periods over the last 2,800 years.

== Description ==
The site comprises six caves, in coral limestone upraised about 5 m (16 ft), at the seaward tip of the Népoui Peninsula on the north-west coast of Grande Terre, about 240 km (149.1 mi) north-west of Noumea. Two of the caves have easy walk-in access; they contain the richest cultural material and the fewest fossils. The other four caves are sinkholes capable of trapping animals, especially ground-dwelling and flightless birds, and contain the most fossils. All the caves broaden from their entrances into large underground chambers.

Numerous subfossils of extinct fauna have been found in the caves, including the endemic terrestrial crocodile Mekosuchus, the giant horned turtle Meiolania, and numerous bird taxa, with remains of the giant flightless Sylviornis being especially common.
