= Shikari =

Shikari may refer to:

== Films ==
- Shikari (1946 film), a Bollywood film
- Shikari (1963 film), a Hindi film
- Shikari (1991 film), a Hindi film
- Shikari (2000 film), a Hindi film
- Shikari (2012 film), a Kannada and Malayalam film
- Shikari (2016 film), an Indian-Bangladeshi film, also starring Shakib Khan

== Other uses ==
- HMS Shikari (D85), a British Admiralty S class destroyer
- Shikari (DC Comics), a fictional character from the DC comics Legion of Super-Heroes series
- Shikari Shambu, an Indian comic character created by Vasant Halbe
- Shikārī, the author of Karamanname
- Enter Shikari, an English rock band

== See also ==
- Shikaar (disambiguation)
- Shikara (disambiguation)
