= Shikara (disambiguation) =

Shikara, Shikhara, and other variants can refer to one of the following:

- Shikara, a type of wooden ship found on Dal Lake
- Shikhara, the rising roof of a Hindu temple in North India
- Shikra, a bird of prey also known as the little banded goshawk
- Sikra, a village in Bhachau Taluka of Kutch district of Gujarat, India.

== Films ==
- Shikar (1968 film), a Bollywood film
- Shikhar (2005 film), a Bollywood drama film
- Shikar (2006 film), a Bollywood drama film
- Shikara (2020 film), a Bollywood romantic drama film

== Other uses ==
- Code Shikara, a computer worm, related to the Dorkbot family
