= Japan Tikri =

Japan Tikri Japan Tikry
- village
- Country: India
- State: Andaman and Nicobar Islands
- District: Nicobar
- Tehsil: Nancowry

Population (2011)
  - Total: 488
- Time zone: UTC+5:30 (IST)
- Census code: 645082

Japan Tikri is a village in the Nicobar district of Andaman and Nicobar Islands, India. It is located in the Nancowry tehsil, on the Katchal Island.

== Demographics ==
According to the 2011 census of India, Japan Tikri has 116 households. The effective literacy rate (i.e. the literacy rate of population excluding children aged 6 and below) is 67.27%.

Demographics (2011 Census)
	Total	Male	Female
Population	488	265	223
Children aged below 6 years	103	57	46
Scheduled caste	0	0	0
Scheduled tribe	445	235	210
Literates	259	148	111
Workers (all)	186	122	64
Main workers (total)	42	28	14
Main workers: Cultivators	0	0	0
Main workers: Agricultural labourers	0	0	0
Main workers: Household industry workers	0	0	0
Main workers: Other	42	28	14
Marginal workers (total)	144	94	50
Marginal workers: Cultivators	1	1	0
Marginal workers: Agricultural labourers	0	0	0
Marginal workers: Household industry workers	1	1	0
Marginal workers: Others	142	92	50
Non-workers	302	143	159
