= Shikaar =

Shikaar or Shikar may refer to:

== Films ==
- Shikar (1958 film), a Bengali film
- Shikar (1968 film), a Hindi movie produced and directed by Atma Ram
- Shikaar (2004 film), starring Raj Babbar
- Shikar (2006 film), a Bengali film
- Shikhar (2005 film), a Hindi film
- Shikkar, a 2010 film starring Mohanlal

== Other uses ==
- Shikar (hunting), a form of hunting in colonial India
- Shikar, a tala (a rhythm in Hindustani music)

== See also ==
- Shikari (disambiguation)
