= E-Wall =

- village
- Country: India
- State: Andaman and Nicobar Islands
- District: Nicobar
- Tehsil: Nancowry

Population (2011)
  - Total: 245
- Time zone: UTC+5:30 (IST)
- Census code: 645083

E-Wall is a village in the Nicobar district of Andaman and Nicobar Islands, India. It is located in the Nancowry tehsil, on the Katchal Island.

== Demographics ==
According to the 2011 census of India, E-Wall has 54 households. The effective literacy rate (i.e. the literacy rate of population excluding children aged 6 and below) is 82.09%.

Demographics (2011 Census)
	Total	Male	Female
Population	245	140	105
Children aged below 6 years	44	22	22
Scheduled caste	0	0	0
Scheduled tribe	189	97	92
Literates	165	102	63
Workers (all)	103	88	15
Main workers (total)	102	88	14
Main workers: Cultivators	1	1	0
Main workers: Agricultural labourers	0	0	0
Main workers: Household industry workers	0	0	0
Main workers: Other	101	87	14
Marginal workers (total)	1	0	1
Marginal workers: Cultivators	0	0	0
Marginal workers: Agricultural labourers	0	0	0
Marginal workers: Household industry workers	0	0	0
Marginal workers: Others	1	0	1
Non-workers	142	52	90
