= Mildera =

- village
- Location in Andaman and Nicobar Islands, India Mildera (India)
- Coordinates: 07°59′55″N 93°22′43″E
- Country: India
- State: Andaman and Nicobar Islands
- District: Nicobar
- Tehsil: Nancowry

Population (2011)
  - Total: 1,350
- Time zone: UTC+5:30 (IST)
- Census code: 645079

Mildera is a village in the Nicobar district of Andaman and Nicobar Islands, India. It is located in the Nancowry tehsil, on the Katchal Island.

== Demographics ==
According to the 2011 census of India, Mildera had 403 households. The effective literacy rate (i.e. the literacy rate of population excluding children aged 6 and below) was 80.95%.

Demographics (2011 Census)
	Total	Male	Female
Population	1,350	795	555
Children aged below 6 years	132	67	65
Scheduled caste	0	0	0
Scheduled tribe	67	30	37
Literates	986	621	365
Workers (all)	691	530	161
Main workers (total)	619	475	144
Main workers: Cultivators	2	1	1
Main workers: Agricultural labourers	1	1	0
Main workers: Household industry workers	0	0	0
Main workers: Other	616	473	143
Marginal workers (total)	72	55	17
Marginal workers: Cultivators	0	0	0
Marginal workers: Agricultural labourers	0	0	0
Marginal workers: Household industry workers	0	0	0
Marginal workers: Others	72	55	17
Non-workers	659	265	394
