= Meenakshi Ram Nagar =

- village
- Country: India
- State: Andaman and Nicobar Islands
- District: Nicobar
- Tehsil: Nancowry

Population (2011)
  - Total: 381
- Time zone: UTC+5:30 (IST)
- Census code: 645081

Meenakshi Ram Nagar is a village in the Nicobar district of Andaman and Nicobar Islands, India. It is located in the Nancowry tehsil, on the Katchal Island.

== Demographics ==
According to the 2011 census of India, Meenakshi Ram Nagar has 86 households. The effective literacy rate (i.e. the literacy rate of population excluding children aged 6 and below) is 82.78%.

Demographics (2011 Census)
	Total	Male	Female
Population	381	216	165
Children aged below 6 years	50	25	25
Scheduled caste	0	0	0
Scheduled tribe	323	171	152
Literates	274	176	98
Workers (all)	222	150	72
Main workers (total)	210	142	68
Main workers: Cultivators	0	0	0
Main workers: Agricultural labourers	0	0	0
Main workers: Household industry workers	3	2	1
Main workers: Other	207	140	67
Marginal workers (total)	12	8	4
Marginal workers: Cultivators	0	0	0
Marginal workers: Agricultural labourers	0	0	0
Marginal workers: Household industry workers	1	0	1
Marginal workers: Others	11	8	3
Non-workers	159	66	93
