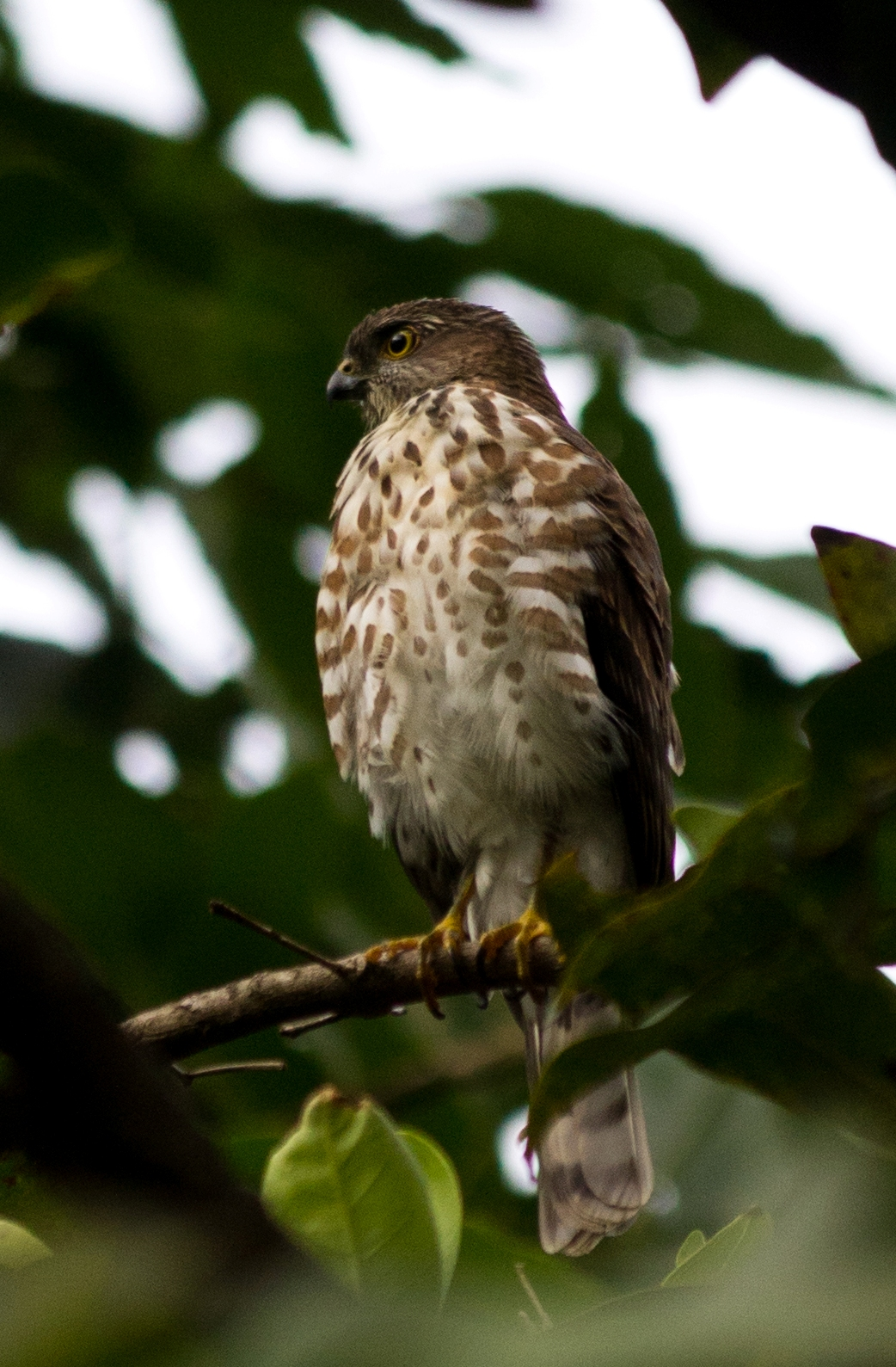
- Besra Sparrowhawk at Waththegama, Sri Lanka

Conservation status
- Least Concern (IUCN 3.1)

Scientific classification
- Kingdom: Animalia
- Phylum: Chordata
- Class: Aves
- Order: Accipitriformes
- Family: Accipitridae
- Genus: Tachyspiza
- Species: T. virgata

Binomial name
- Tachyspiza virgata (Temminck, 1822)
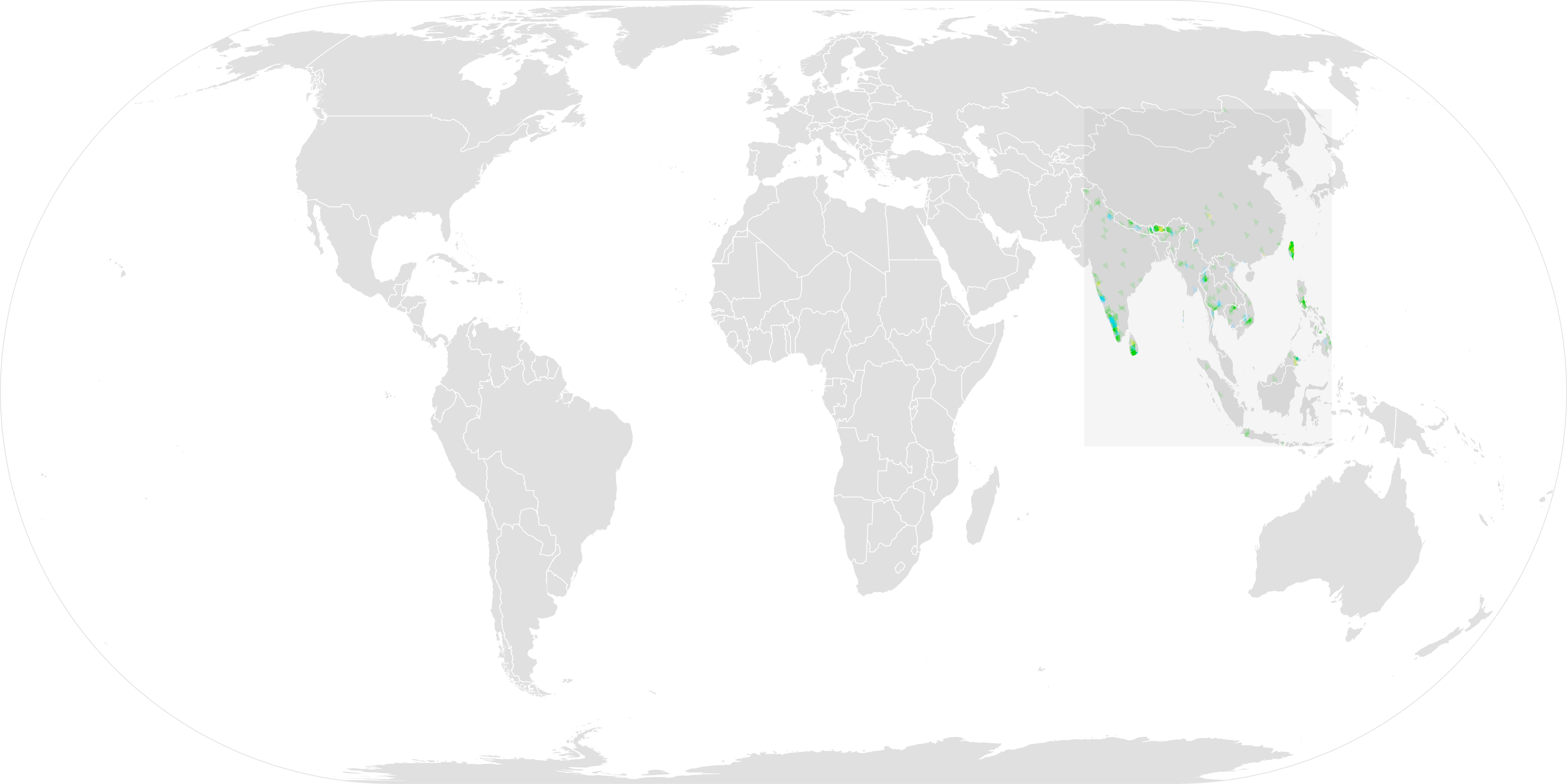
- Global range Year-Round Range Summer Range Winter Range

= Besra =

Species of bird

The besra (Tachyspiza virgata), also called the besra sparrowhawk, is a bird of prey in the family Accipitridae. It was formerly placed in the genus Accipiter. The name "besra" is from the Hindi word for the species.

The besra is a widespread resident breeder in dense forests throughout southern Asia, ranging from the Indian subcontinent eastwards across Southeast Asia and into East Asia. It nests in trees, building a new nest each year. It lays 2 to 5 eggs. It is a medium-sized raptor (29 to 36 cm) with short broad wings and a long tail, both adaptations to fast maneuvering through dense vegetation. The normal flight of this species is a characteristic "flap–flap–glide".

This species is like a darker version of the widespread shikra with darker upperparts, strongly barred underwing, broader gular stripe and thin long legs and toes. The adult male besra has dark blue-grey upperparts, and is white, barred reddish brown below. The larger female is browner above than the male. The juvenile is dark brown above and white, barred with brown below. In all plumages have 3-4 equally sized dark bands on uppertail.

In winter, the besra will emerge into more open woodland including savannah and cultivation. Its hunting technique is similar to other small hawks such as the sparrowhawk and the sharp-shinned hawk, relying on surprise as it flies from a hidden perch or flicks over a bush to catch its prey unaware.

The prey is lizards, dragonflies, and small birds and mammals.

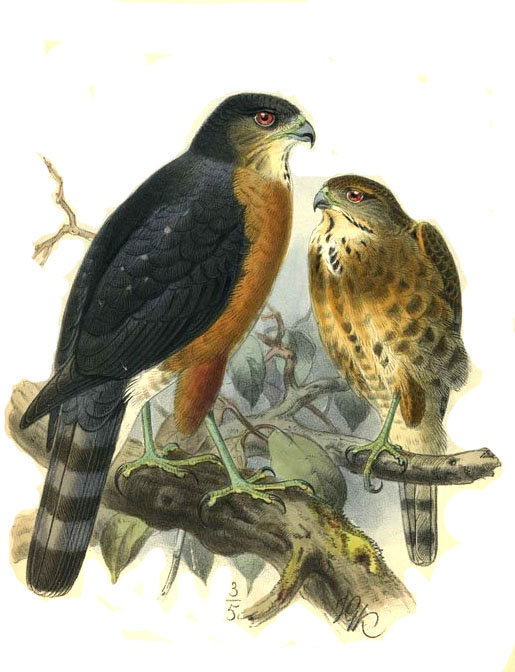
Besra Illustration by Keulemans

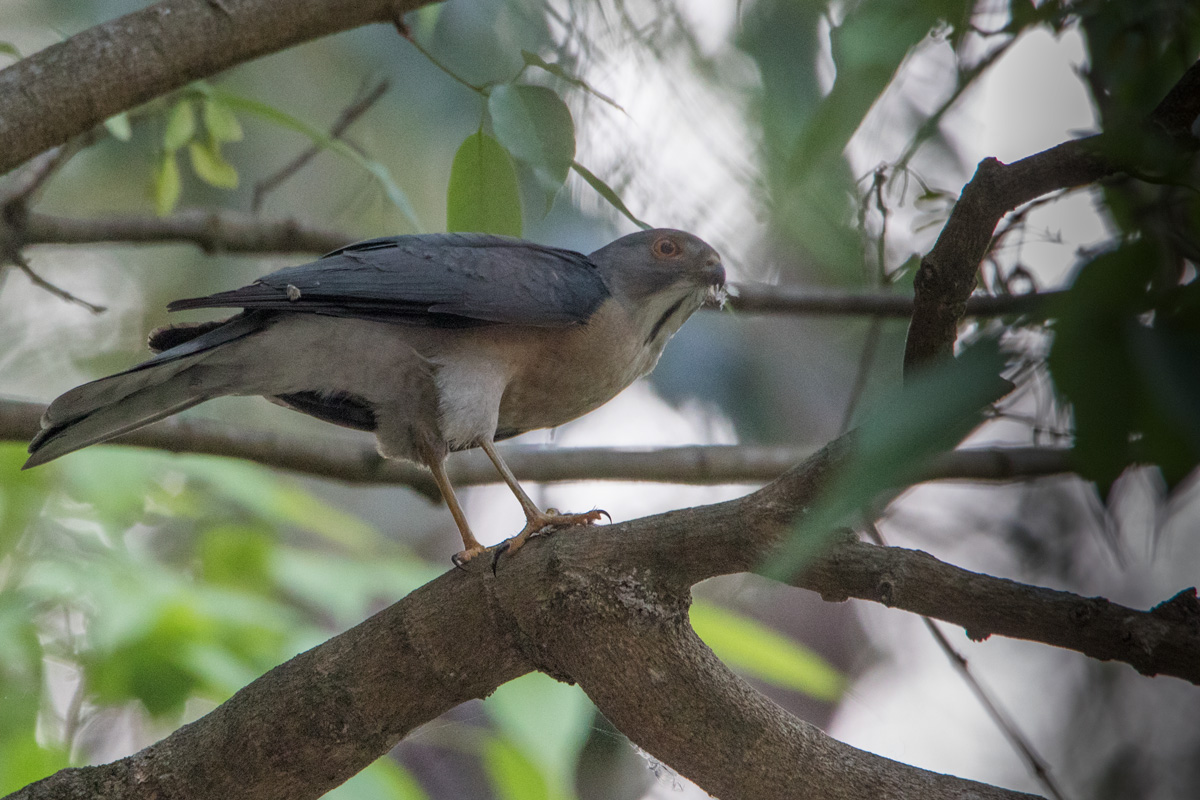
At Sattal, India

== Taxonomy ==
The besra was formally described and illustrated in 1822 by the Dutch zoologist Coenraad Jacob Temminck based on a specimen collected on the island of Java. He coined the binomial name Falco virgatus. The specific epithet virgatus is Latin meaning "striped" or "streaked". The species was formerly placed in the genus Accipiter. In 2024 a comprehensive molecular phylogenetic study of the Accipitridae confirmed earlier work that had shown that the genus was polyphyletic. To resolve the non-monophyly, Accipiter was divided into six genera. The genus Tachyspiza was resurrected to accommodate the besra together with 26 other species that had previously been placed in Accipiter. The resurrected genus had been introduced in 1844 by the German naturalist Johann Jakob Kaup. The genus name combines the Ancient Greek ταχυς (takhus) meaning "fast" with σπιζιας (spizias) meaning "hawk". The English "besra" is from the Hindi word Besrā for a female besra.

Ten subspecies are recognised:

- T. v. affinis (Hodgson, 1836) – west Himalayas to central China and Indochina
- T. v. fuscipectus (Mees, 1970) – Taiwan
- T. v. besra (Jerdon, 1839) – south India and Sri Lanka
- T. v. vanbemmeli (Voous, 1950) – montane Sumatra
- T. v. rufotibialis (Sharpe, 1887) – montane Borneo
- T. v. virgata (Temminck, 1822) – montane Java and Bali
- T. v. quinquefasciata (Mees, 1984) – montane Flores (central Lesser Sunda Islands)
- T. v. abdulalii (Mees, 1981) – Andaman and Nicobar Islands
- T. v. confusa (Hartert, EJO, 1910) – north, central Philippines
- T. v. quagga (Parkes, 1973) – central, south Philippines (except Palawan group and Sulu Archipelago)
