= Upper Katchal =

- village
- Location in Andaman and Nicobar Islands, India Upper Katchal (India)
- Coordinates: 7.968089°N 93.356774°E
- Country: India
- State: Andaman and Nicobar Islands
- District: Nicobar
- Tehsil: Nancowry

Population (2011)
  - Total: 217
- Time zone: UTC+5:30 (IST)
- Census code: 645080

Upper Katchal is a village in the Nicobar district of Andaman and Nicobar Islands, India. It is located in the Nancowry tehsil, on the Katchal Island.

== Demographics ==
According to the 2011 census of India, Upper Katchal has 55 households. The effective literacy rate (i.e. the literacy rate of population excluding children aged 6 and below) is 67.96%.

Demographics (2011 Census)
| | Total | Male | Female |
|---|---|---|---|
| Population | 217 | 120 | 97 |
| Children aged below 6 years | 36 | 16 | 20 |
| Scheduled caste | 0 | 0 | 0 |
| Scheduled tribe | 211 | 117 | 94 |
| Literates | 123 | 81 | 42 |
| Workers (all) | 157 | 94 | 63 |
| Main workers (total) | 105 | 63 | 42 |
| Main workers: Cultivators | 0 | 0 | 0 |
| Main workers: Agricultural labourers | 0 | 0 | 0 |
| Main workers: Household industry workers | 0 | 0 | 0 |
| Main workers: Other | 105 | 63 | 42 |
| Marginal workers (total) | 52 | 31 | 21 |
| Marginal workers: Cultivators | 0 | 0 | 0 |
| Marginal workers: Agricultural labourers | 0 | 0 | 0 |
| Marginal workers: Household industry workers | 0 | 0 | 0 |
| Marginal workers: Others | 52 | 31 | 21 |
| Non-workers | 60 | 26 | 34 |
