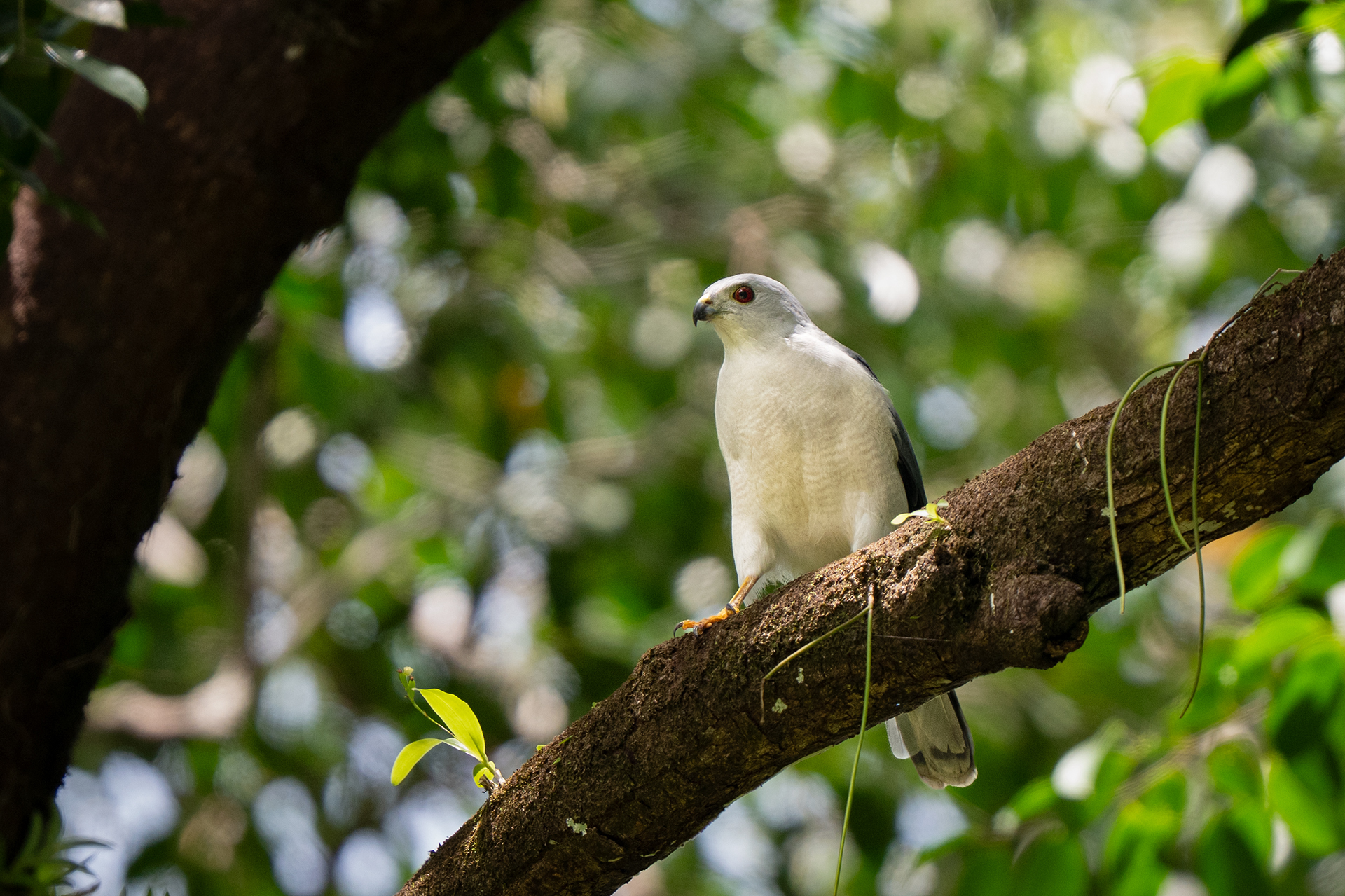

Conservation status
- Vulnerable (IUCN 3.1)

Scientific classification
- Kingdom: Animalia
- Phylum: Chordata
- Class: Aves
- Order: Accipitriformes
- Family: Accipitridae
- Genus: Tachyspiza
- Species: T. butleri

Binomial name
- Tachyspiza butleri (Gurney, JH Jr, 1898)

Subspecies
- T. b. butleri - (Gurney Jr, 1898); T. b. obsoleta - (Richmond, 1902)
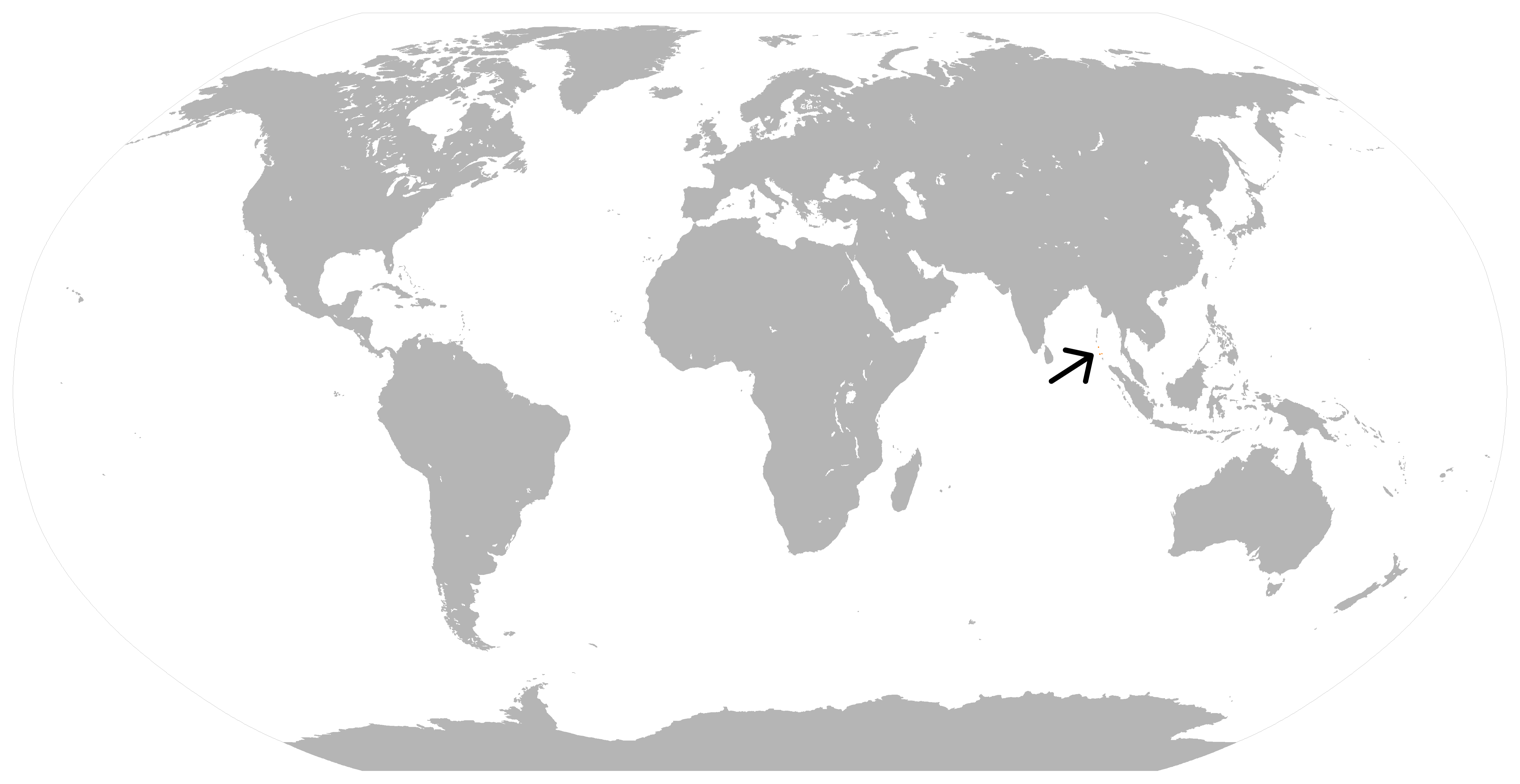

= Nicobar sparrowhawk =

Species of bird

The Nicobar sparrowhawk (Tachyspiza butleri) is a species of bird of prey in the family Accipitridae. It is endemic to the Nicobar Islands of India. There are two subspecies, the nominate race which is found on Car Nicobar in the north of the archipelago, and T. b. obsoleta, from Katchal and Camorta in the central part of the Nicobars. A museum specimen originally attributed to this species from the island of Great Nicobar was later found to be a misidentified Besra. This species was formerly classified in the genus Accipiter.

Its natural habitat is subtropical or tropical moist lowland forests. It is threatened by habitat loss.

== Description ==
It has a length of 28 to 34 cm and a wingspan of 50 to 57 cm.
