= Sikra =

Coordinates: 23.340611°N 70.300709°E

Sikra is a village in Bhachau Taluka of Kutch district of Gujarat, India.

== History ==
Sikra was once been a large and flourishing town. The chief remains are those of a temple of Mahadev Kageshvar, where, according to the story, Dharan Vaghelo, the great-grandfather of Lakha Phulani, used to come every day to worship. The ruins are overgrown with trees. A little to the south of the village, once it is said the heart of the city, is a saint's shrine, and two strong and well built Momna Kanbi tombs built in 1666 (Samvat 1723). Near the shrine is a Jain temple of solid masonry built in 1716 (Samvat 1773) and dedicated to Vasupujya. The marble image of Vasupujya, when in 1785 (Samvat 1842) threatened by the Miyanas, was taken to Adhoi. Near the temple are many memorial stones, one of them bearing as old a date as 1003 (Samvat 1060).
