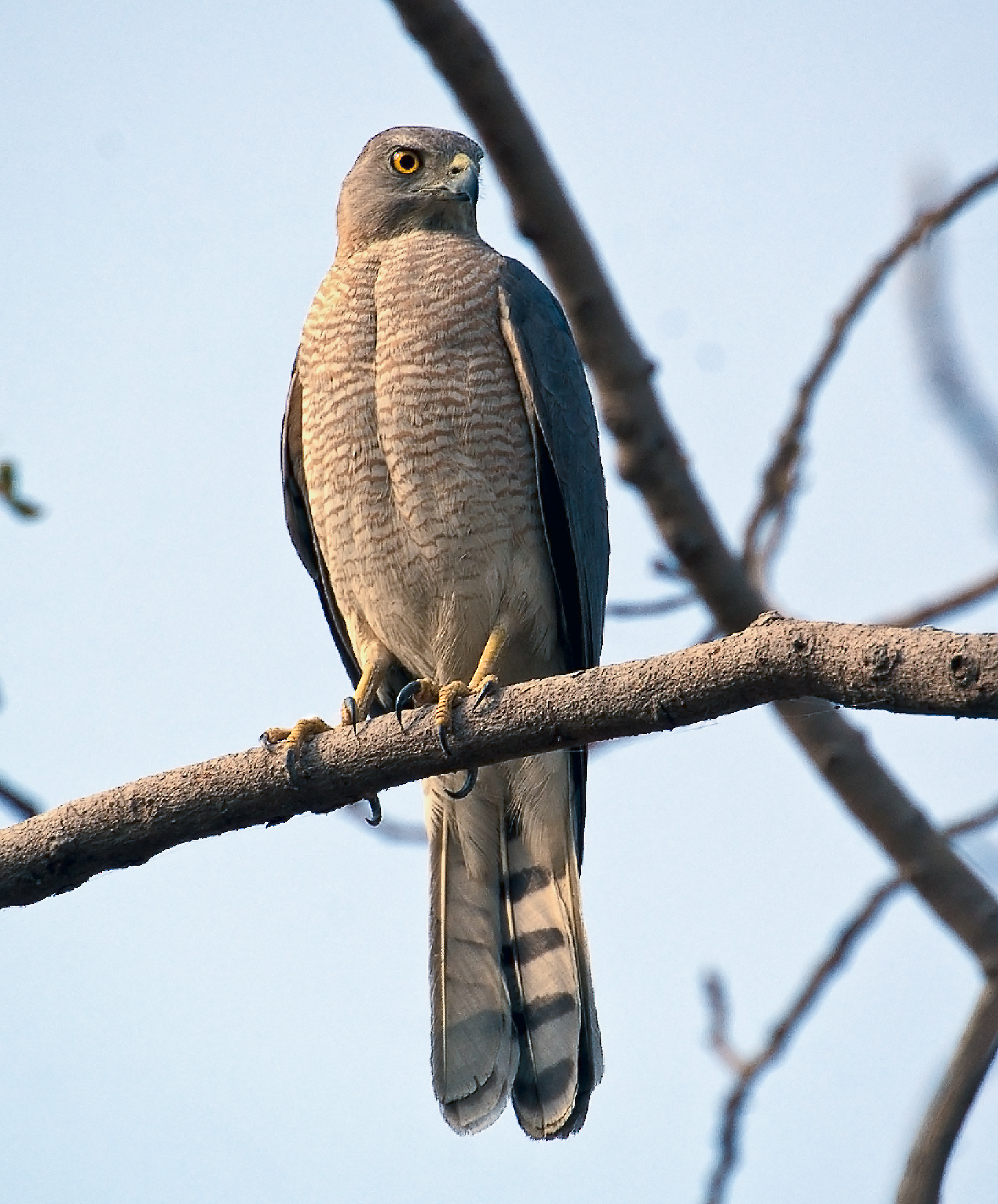
- Adult female (dussumieri)

Conservation status
- Least Concern (IUCN 3.1)

Scientific classification
- Kingdom: Animalia
- Phylum: Chordata
- Class: Aves
- Order: Accipitriformes
- Family: Accipitridae
- Genus: Tachyspiza
- Species: T. badia

Binomial name
- Tachyspiza badia (Gmelin, JF, 1788)

Subspecies
- cenchroides (Severtzov, 1873); dussumieri (Temminck, 1824); badia (Gmelin, 1788); poliopsis (Hume, 1874); sphenura (Rüppell, 1836); polyzonoides (A. Smith, 1838)
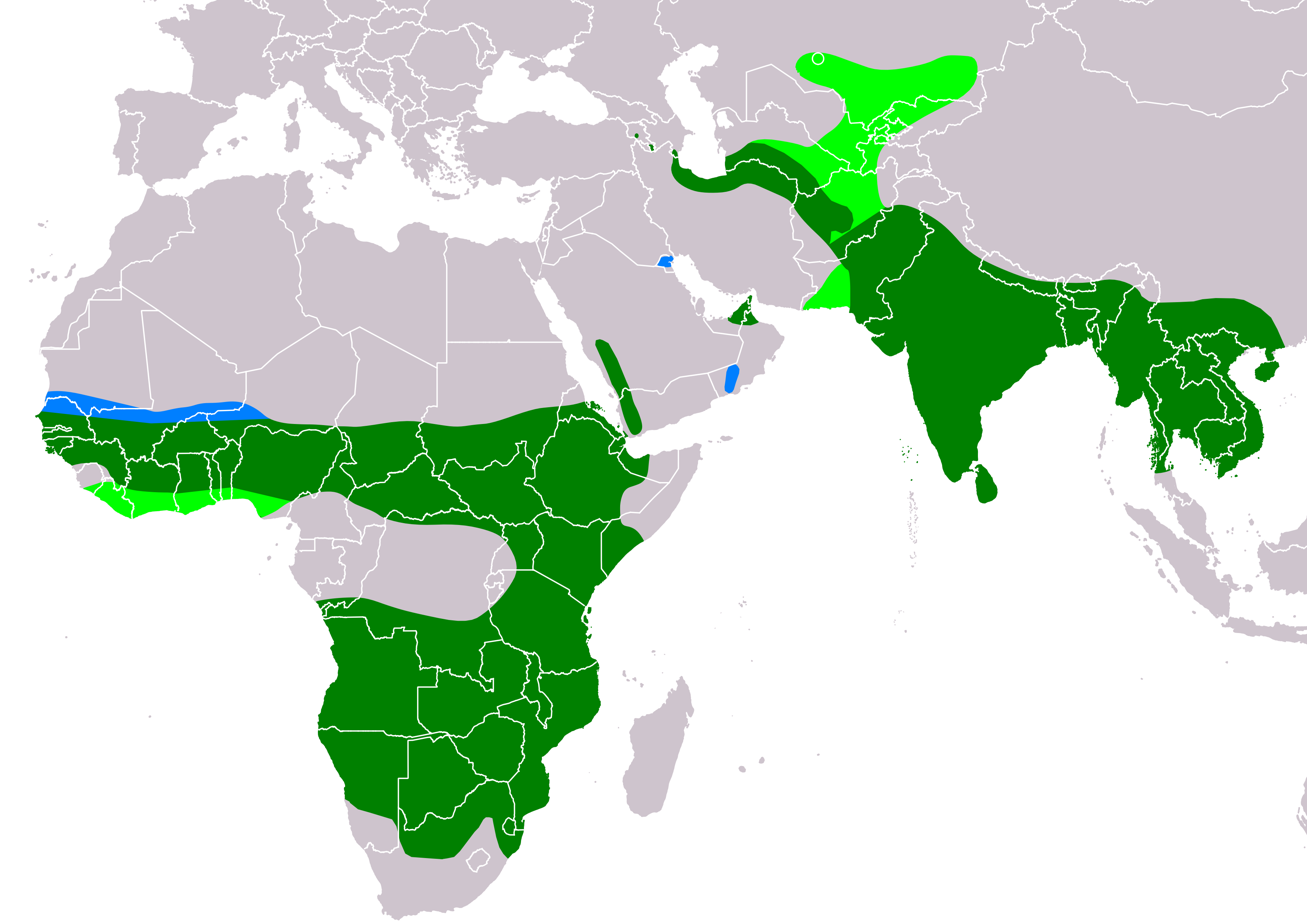
- Range of A. badius Breeding Resident Non-breeding

Synonyms
- Accipiter badius Astur badius Scelospizias badius Micronisus badius

Audio
- Calls

= Shikra =

Species of bird

The shikra (Tachyspiza badia) is a small bird of prey in the family Accipitridae found widely distributed in Asia and Africa where it is also called the little banded goshawk. The African forms may represent a separate species but have usually been considered as subspecies of the shikra. The shikra is very similar in appearance, as well as behavior, at least to some degree, to other species including the Chinese sparrowhawk (Tachyspiza soloensis, formerly Accipiter soloensis), Eurasian goshawk (Astur gentilis) and Eurasian sparrowhawk (Accipiter nisus). They have a sharp two-note call and exhibit the flap-and-glide flight style typical of Tachyspiza and Accipiter hawks. Their calls are imitated by drongos and the common hawk-cuckoo resembles it in plumage. This species was formerly placed in the genus Accipiter.

== Taxonomy ==
The shikra was formally described in 1788/1789 by the German naturalist Johann Friedrich Gmelin in his revised and expanded edition of Carl Linnaeus's Systema Naturae. He placed it with the eagles, hawks and their relatives in the genus Falco and coined the binomial name Falco badius. Gmelin's description was based on the "brown hawk" from Ceylon that had been described and illustrated in 1776 by the English naturalist Peter Brown. The shikra was formerly placed in the large and diverse genus Accipiter. In 2024 a comprehensive molecular phylogenetic study of the Accipitridae confirmed earlier work that had shown that the genus was polyphyletic. To resolve the non-monophyly, Accipiter was divided into six genera. The genus Tachyspiza was resurrected to accommodate the shikra together with 26 other species that had previously been placed in Accipiter. The resurrected genus had been introduced in 1844 by the German naturalist Johann Jakob Kaup. The word Tachyspiza combines the Ancient Greek ταχυς (takhus) meaning "fast" with σπιζιας (spizias) meaning "hawk". The specific epithet badia is Latin meaning "chestnut-coloured" or "brown".

Six subspecies are recognised:

- T. b. sphenura (Rüppell, 1836) – Senegal and Gambia to southwest Arabia south to north Tanzania and north DR Congo
- T. b. polyzonoides (Smith, A, 1838) – south DR Congo and south Tanzania to South Africa
- T. b. cenchroides (Severtsov, 1873) – Caucasus to central Asia and northwest India
- T. b. dussumieri (Temminck, 1824) – central India and Bangladesh
- T. b. poliopsis (Hume, 1874) – north India to south China, Indochina and north Sumatra
- T. b. badia (Gmelin, JF, 1788) – southwest India and Sri Lanka

== Description ==
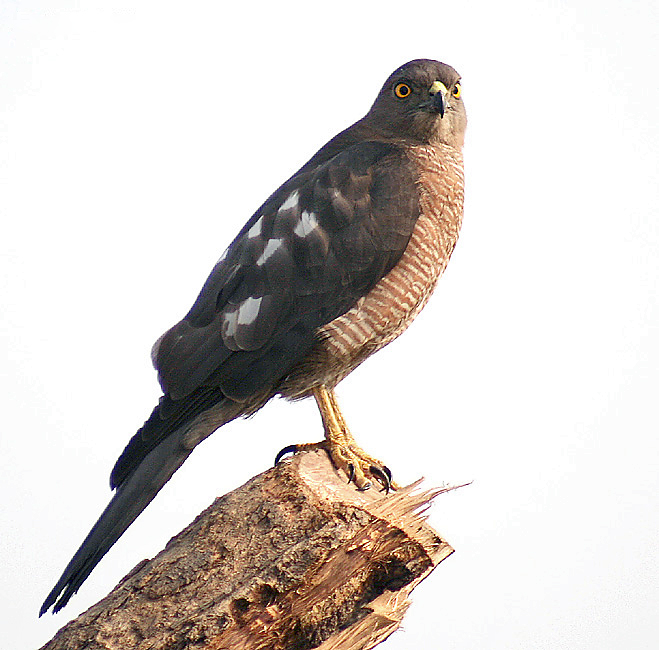
Female (Hodal, India)

The shikra is a small raptor (26–30 cm (10–12 in) long) and, like most other Tachyspiza hawks, has short rounded wings and a narrow and somewhat long tail. Adults are whitish on the underside with fine rufous bars while the upperparts are grey. The lower belly is less barred and the thighs are whitish. Males have a red iris while the females have a less red (yellowish orange) iris and brownish upperparts apart from heavier barring on the underparts. The females are slightly larger. The mesial stripe on the throat is dark but narrow. In flight the male seen from below shows a light wing lining (underwing coverts) and has blackish wing tips. When seen from above the tail bands are faintly marked on the lateral tail feathers and not as strongly marked as in the Eurasian sparrowhawk. The central tail feathers are unbanded and only have a dark terminal band. Juveniles have dark streaks and spots on the upper breast and the wing is narrowly barred while the tail has dark but narrow bands. A post juvenile transitional plumage is found with very strong barring on the contour feathers of the underside. The call is pee-wee, the first note being higher and the second being longer. In flight the calls are shorter and sharper kik-ki ... kik-ki. The Chinese sparrowhawk is somewhat similar in appearance but has swollen bright orange ceres and yellow legs with the wing tips entirely black.

Subspecies cenchroides is larger and paler and found in Turkestan, Afghanistan and eastern Iran. The Indian population dussumieri is resident on the plains and lower hills (up to 1,400 m (4,590 ft) in the Himalayas). The nominate form is found in Sri Lanka and has somewhat darker grey upperparts. The Burmese shikra A. b. poliopsis may represent a distinct species. The population on the island of Car Nicobar, earlier treated as a subspecies butleri and that on Katchal Island, obsoletus are now treated as a sub-species within a full species, the Nicobar sparrowhawk (Tachyspiza butleri). The west African population T. b. sphenurus is migratory while the southern African T. b. polyzonoides is more nomadic in its movements. In Asia only T. b. cenchroides is migratory.

== Behaviour and ecology ==
The shikra is found in a range of habitats including forests, farmland and urban areas. They are usually seen singly or in pairs. The flight is typical with flaps and glides. During the breeding season pairs will soar on thermals and stoop at each other. Their flight usually draws alarms among smaller birds and squirrels. They feed on rodents (including Meriones hurrianae), squirrels, small birds, small reptiles (mainly lizards but sometimes small snakes) and insects. Small birds usually dive through foliage to avoid a shikra and a Small Blue Kingfisher has been observed diving into water to escape. Babblers have been observed to rally together to drive away a shikra. They will descend to the ground to feast on emerging winged termites, hunt at dusk for small bats (such as Cynopterus sphinx) and in rare instances they may even resort to feed on carrion. In one instance a male was found feeding on a dead chick at the nest. Their calls are mimicked by drongos and this behaviour is thought to aid in stealing food by alarming other birds that the drongos associate with.

=== Breeding ===
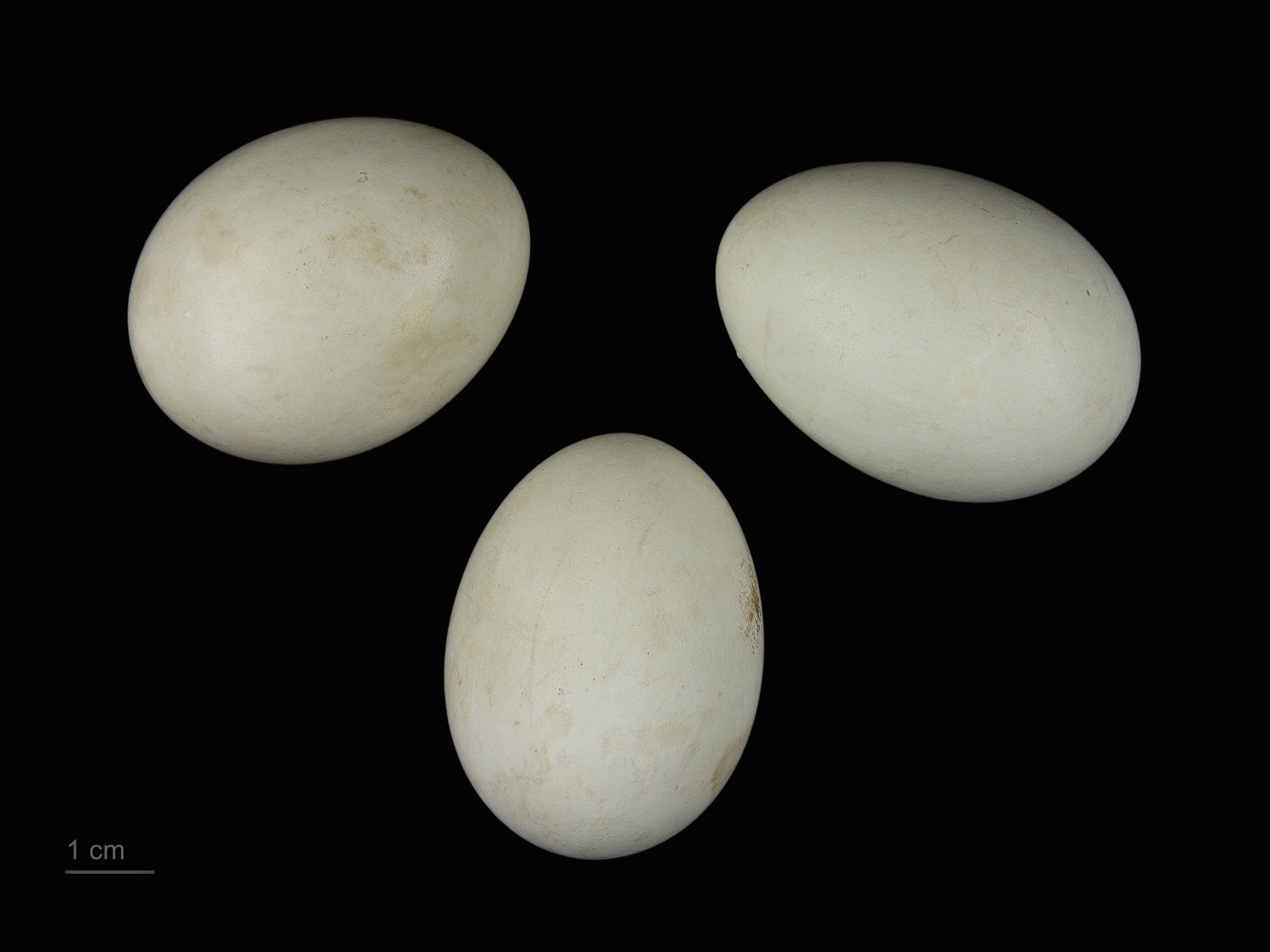
Eggs - Muséum de Toulouse

The breeding season in India is in summer from March to June. The nest is a platform similar to that of crows lined with grass. Both sexes help build the nest, twigs being carried in their feet. Like crows, they may also make use of metal wires. The usual clutch is 3 to 4 eggs (when eggs are removed they lay replacements and one observer noted that they could lay as many as 7 in a season) which are pale bluish grey stippled on the broad end in black. The incubation period is 18 to 21 days.

== In culture ==
The shikra was a favourite among falconers in India and Pakistan due to the ease with which it could be trained and was frequently used to procure food for the more prized falcons. They were noted for their pluck and ability to take much larger birds including partridges, crows and even young peafowl. The word shikra or shikara means hunter in the Hindi language (the male was called chipak or chipka based on call) The word Shikra is borrowed from the Urdu word (شِـكْـره) which is derived from the word shikari (شِكارى) meaning hunter.

The word is also used in the French name Le Chicquera which was however given to the red-necked falcon by Levaillant in 1799.

Famous Punjabi poet Shiv Kumar Batalvi wrote a poem called "Main Ik Shikra Yaar Banaya" about a lost love wherein he compares her to a shikra.

== Gallery ==
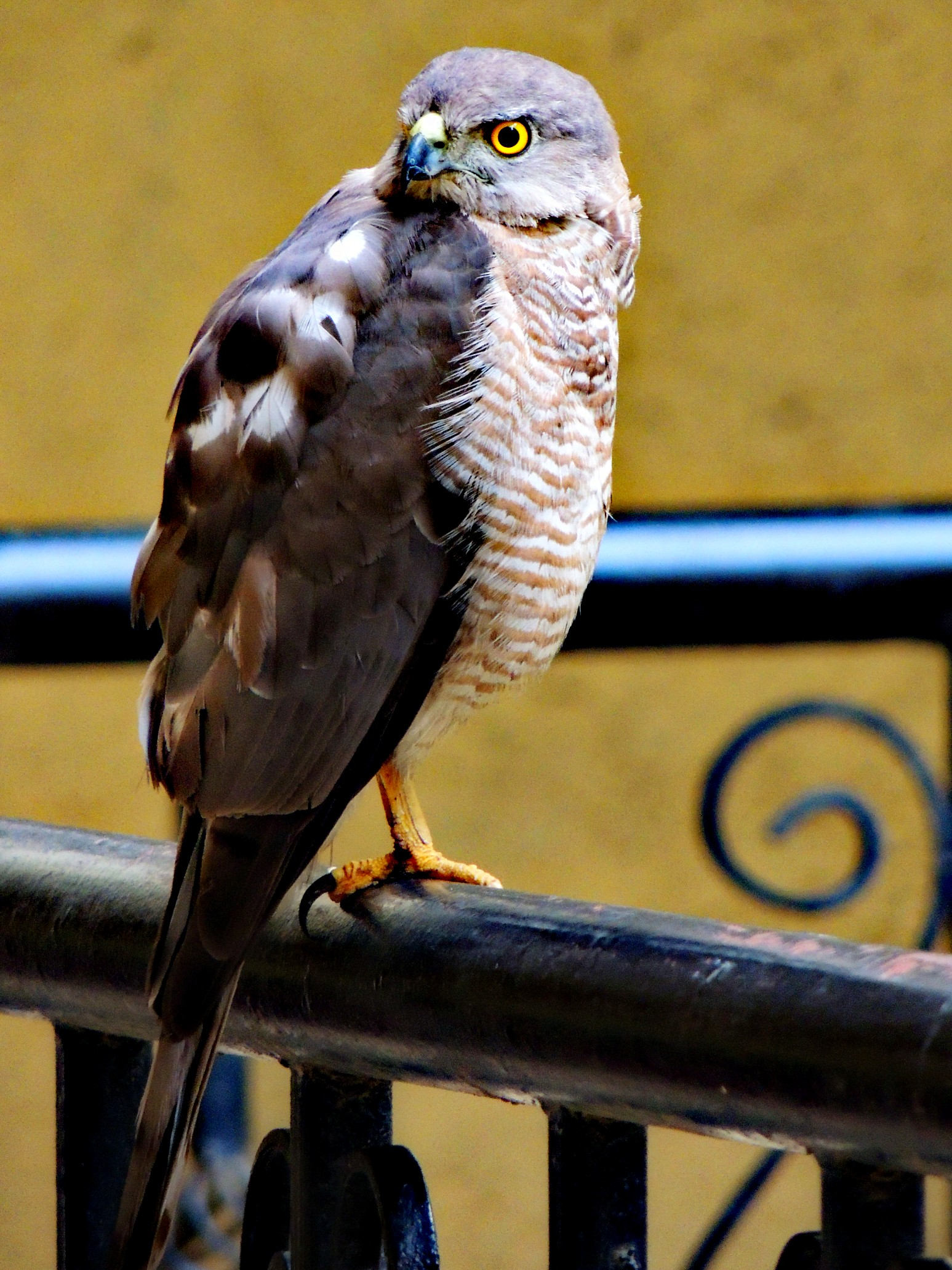
Shikra bird, Pune

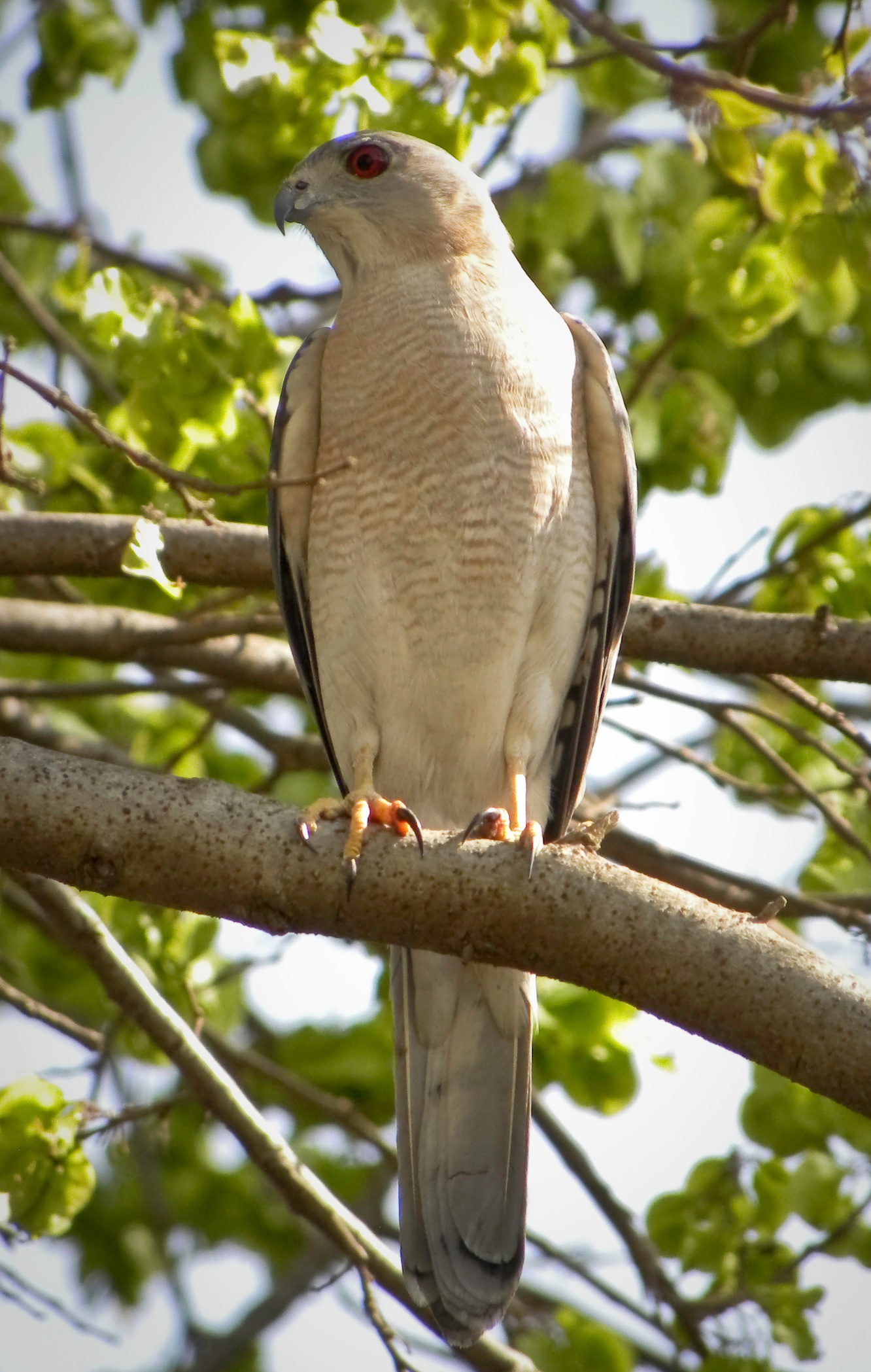
Male at Pune (Maharashtra), India

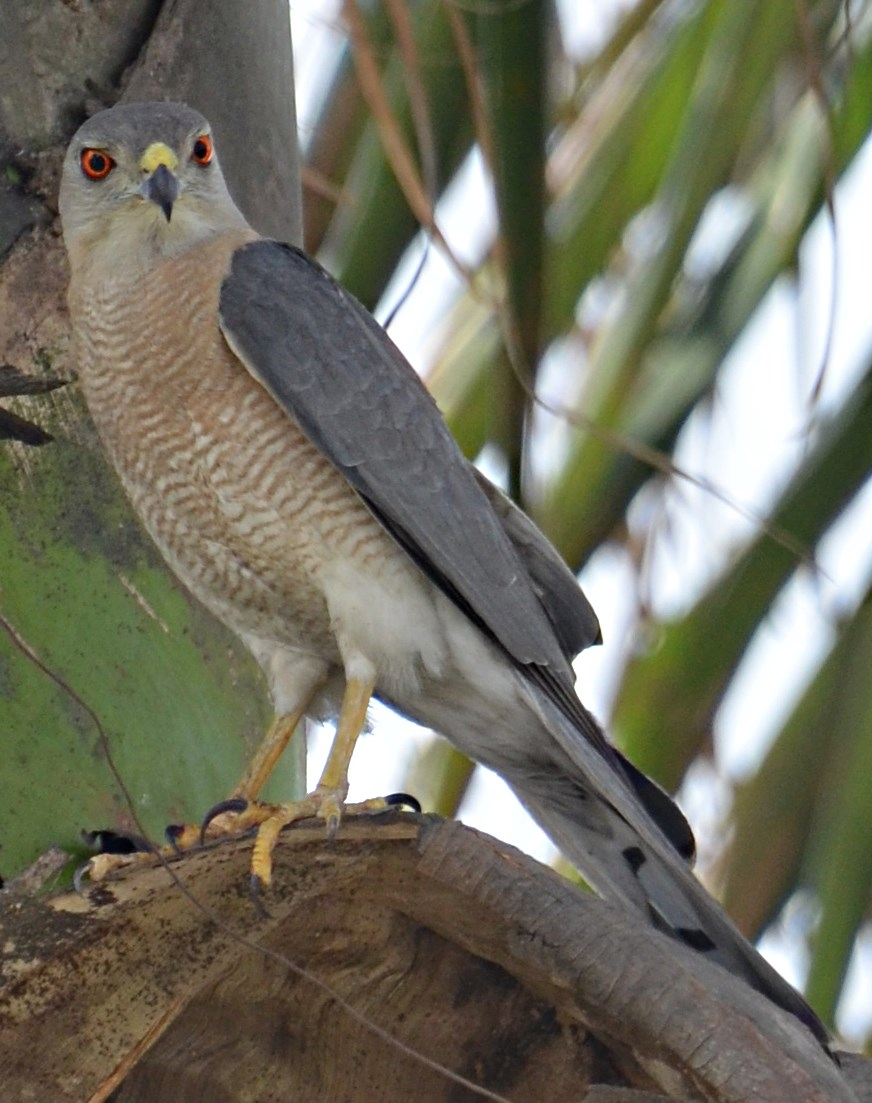
Male at Chandigarh, India

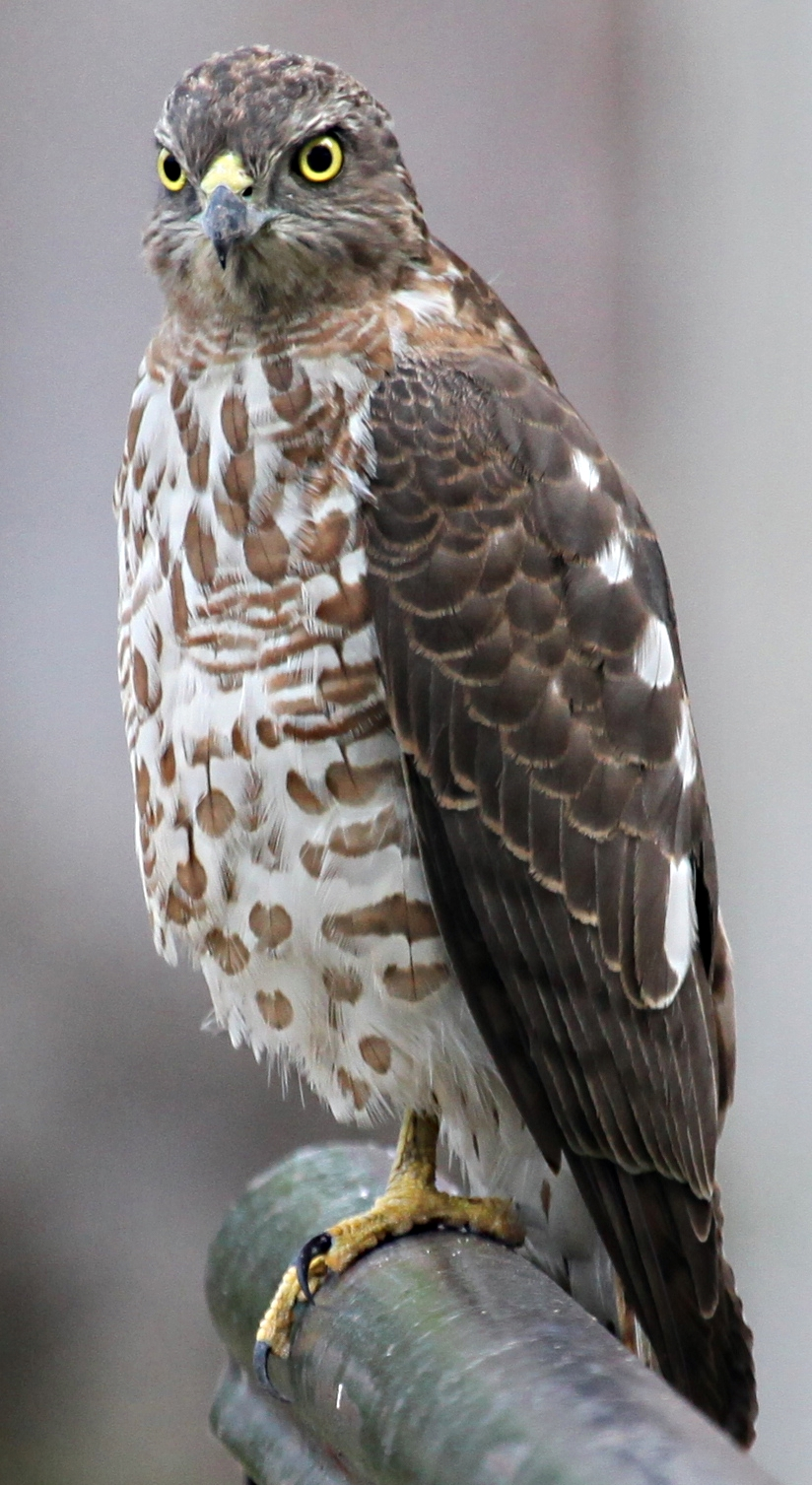
Juvenile at Chandigarh, India

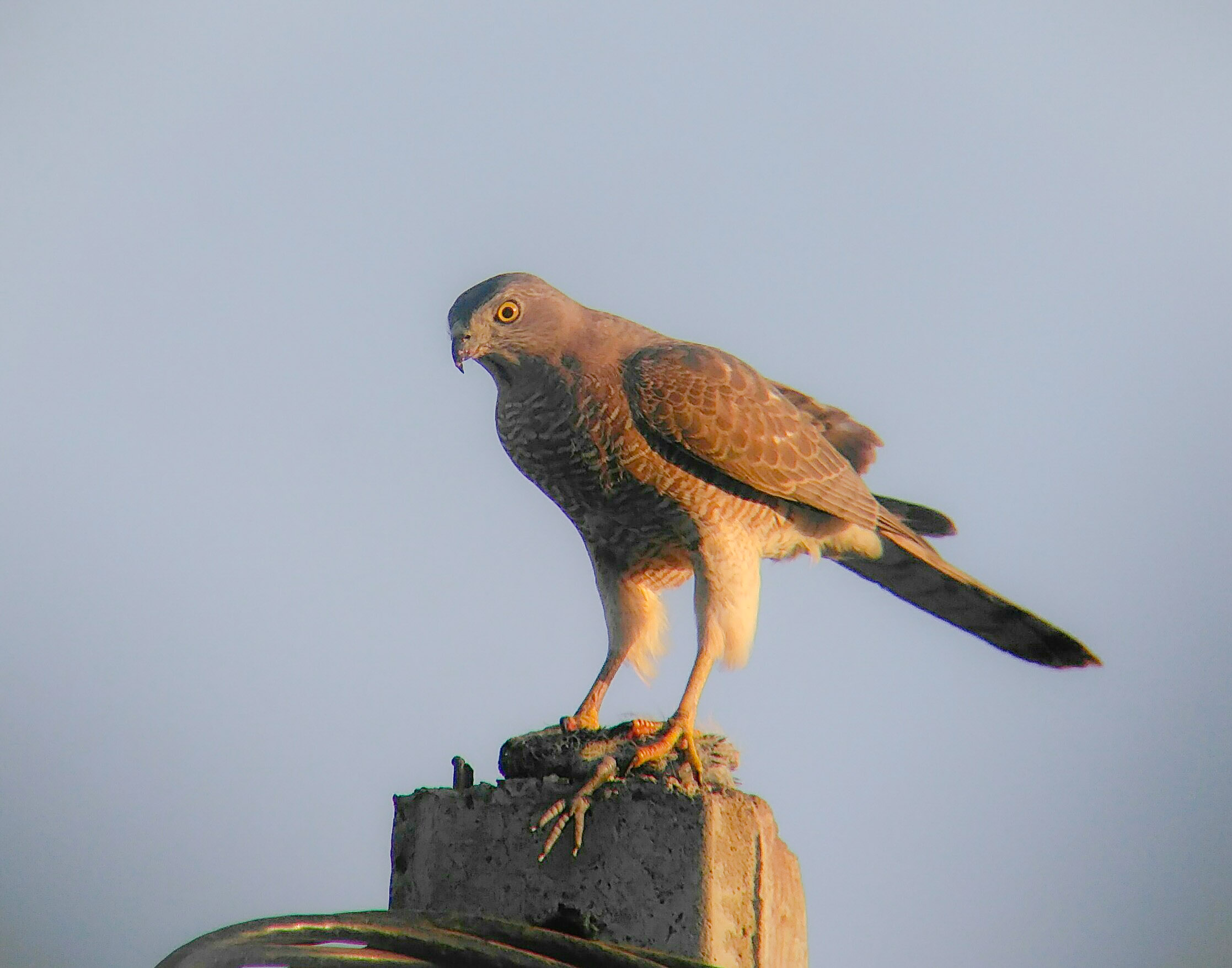
Female with a kill

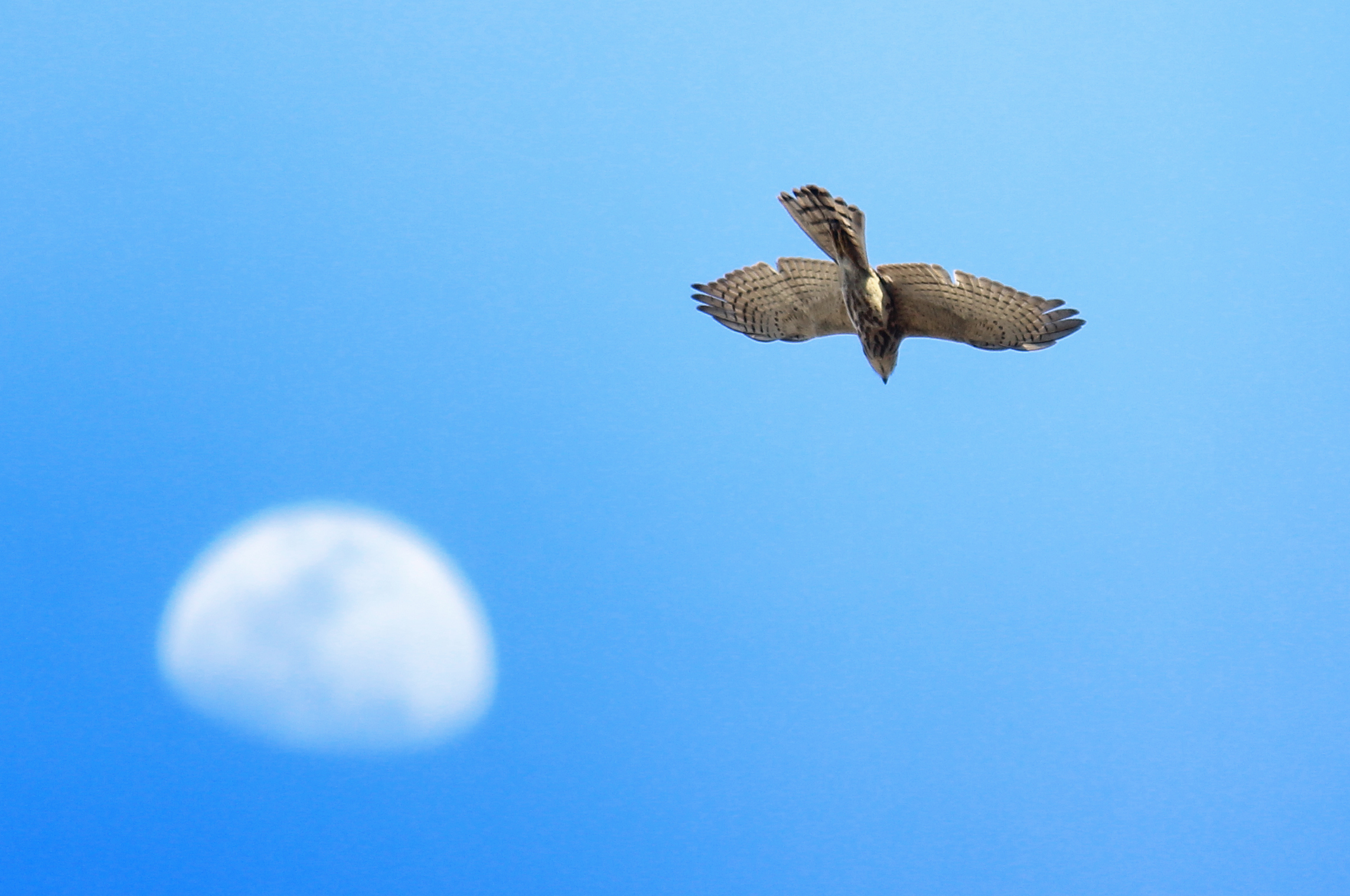
In flight

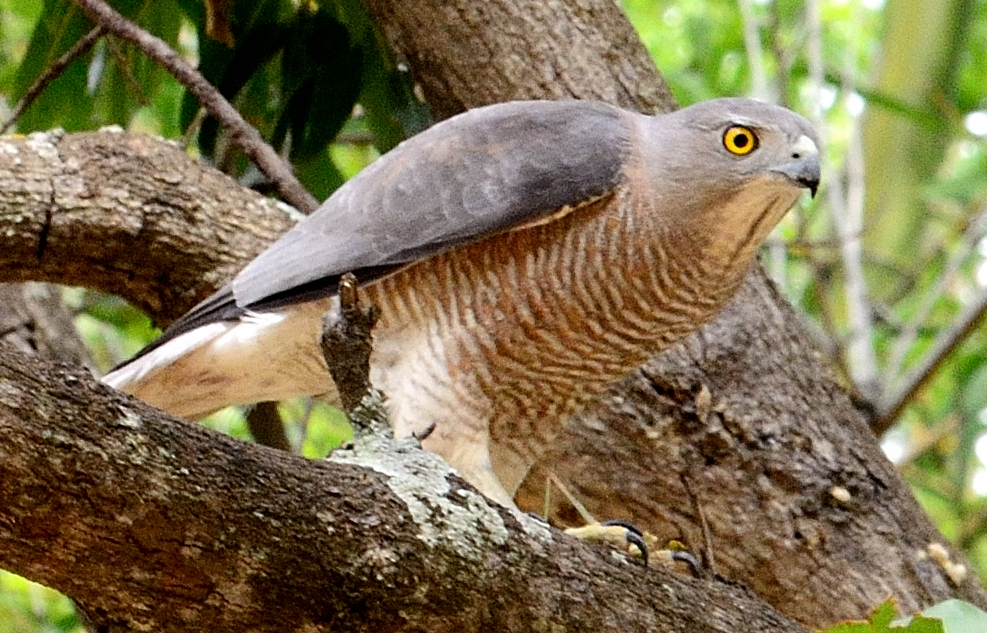
At Bangalore, India

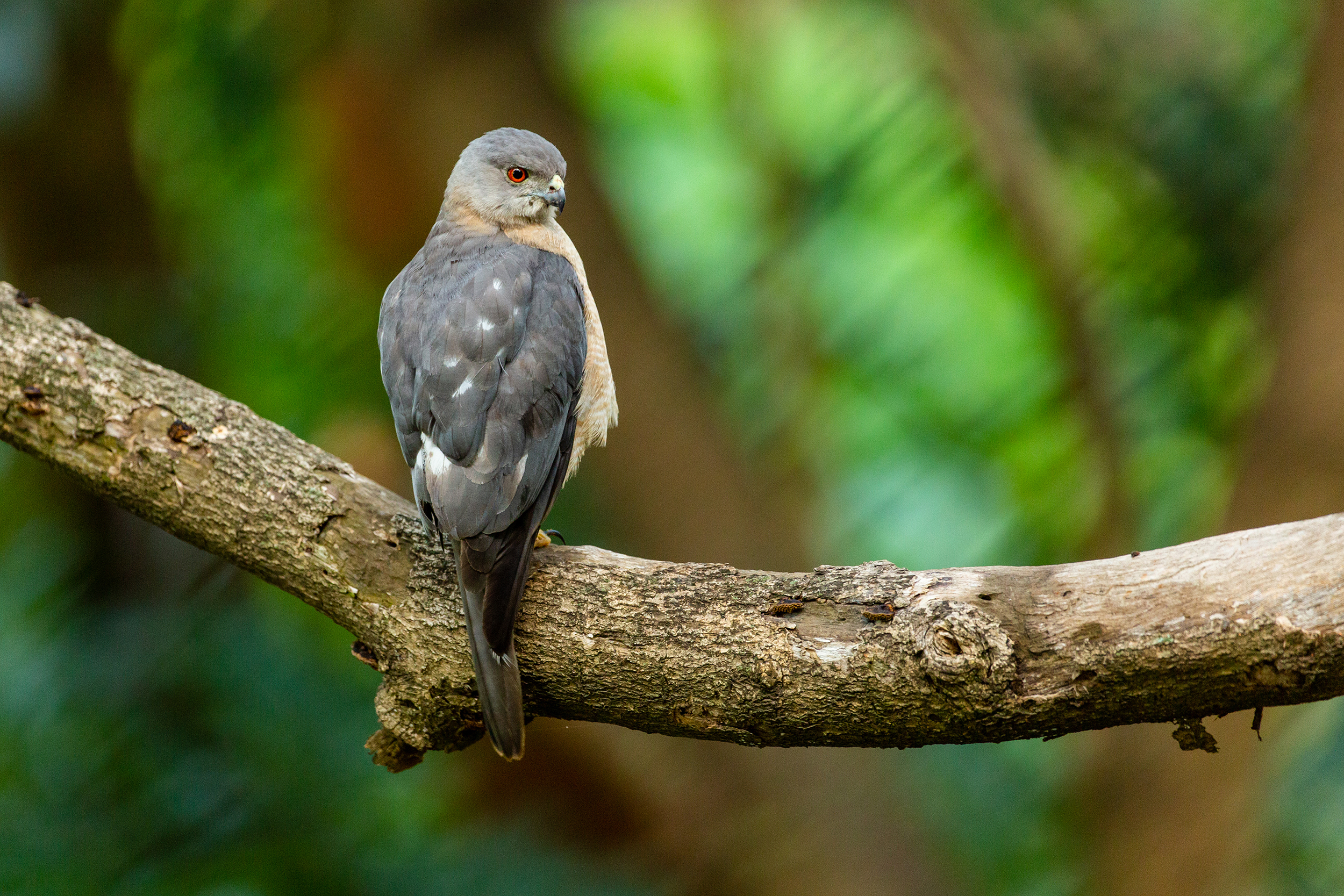
Bangalore, India

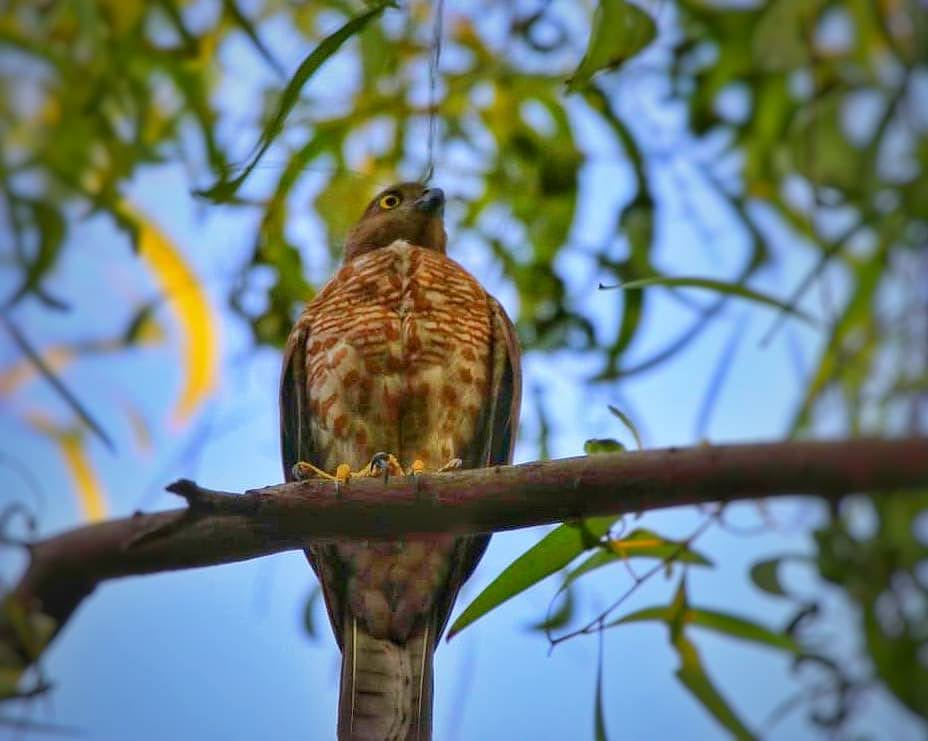
Shikra in Gurgaon, India

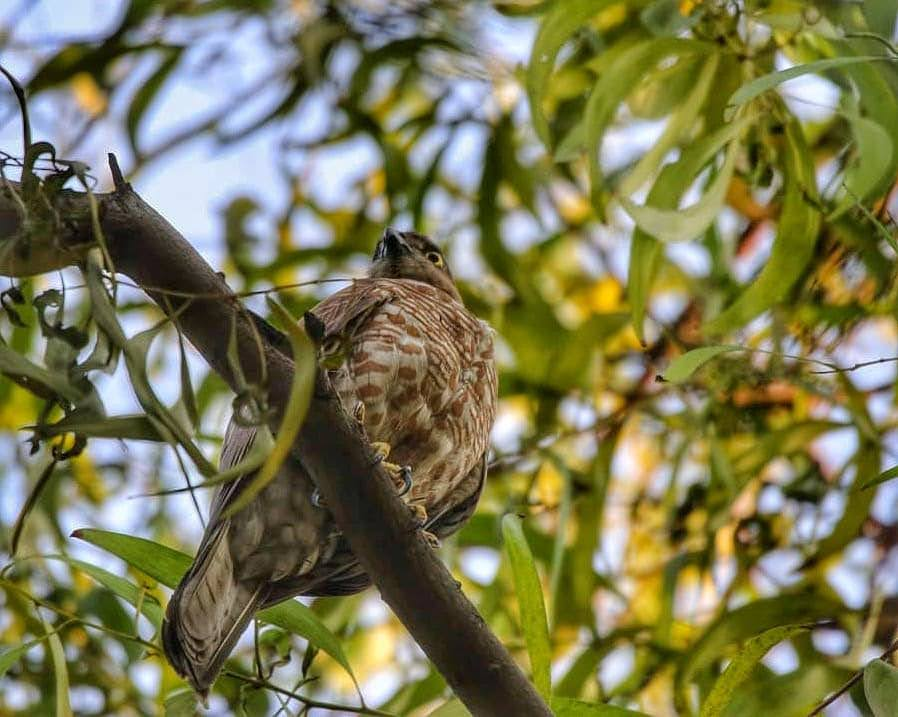
Shikra in Gurgaon, India

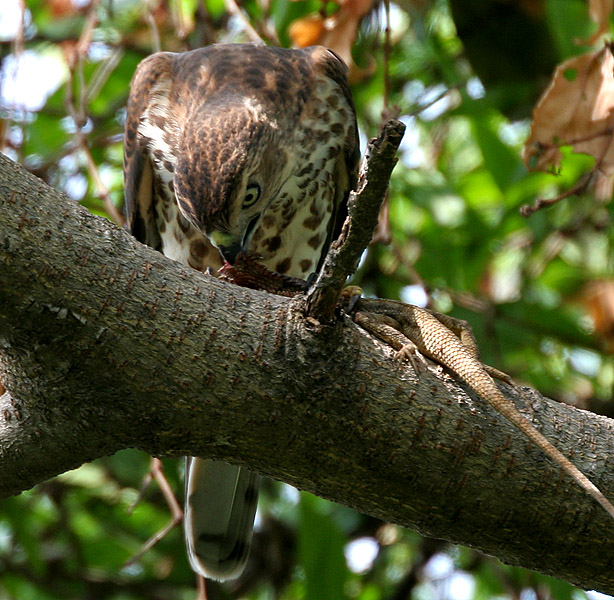
Immature feeding on Calotes versicolor

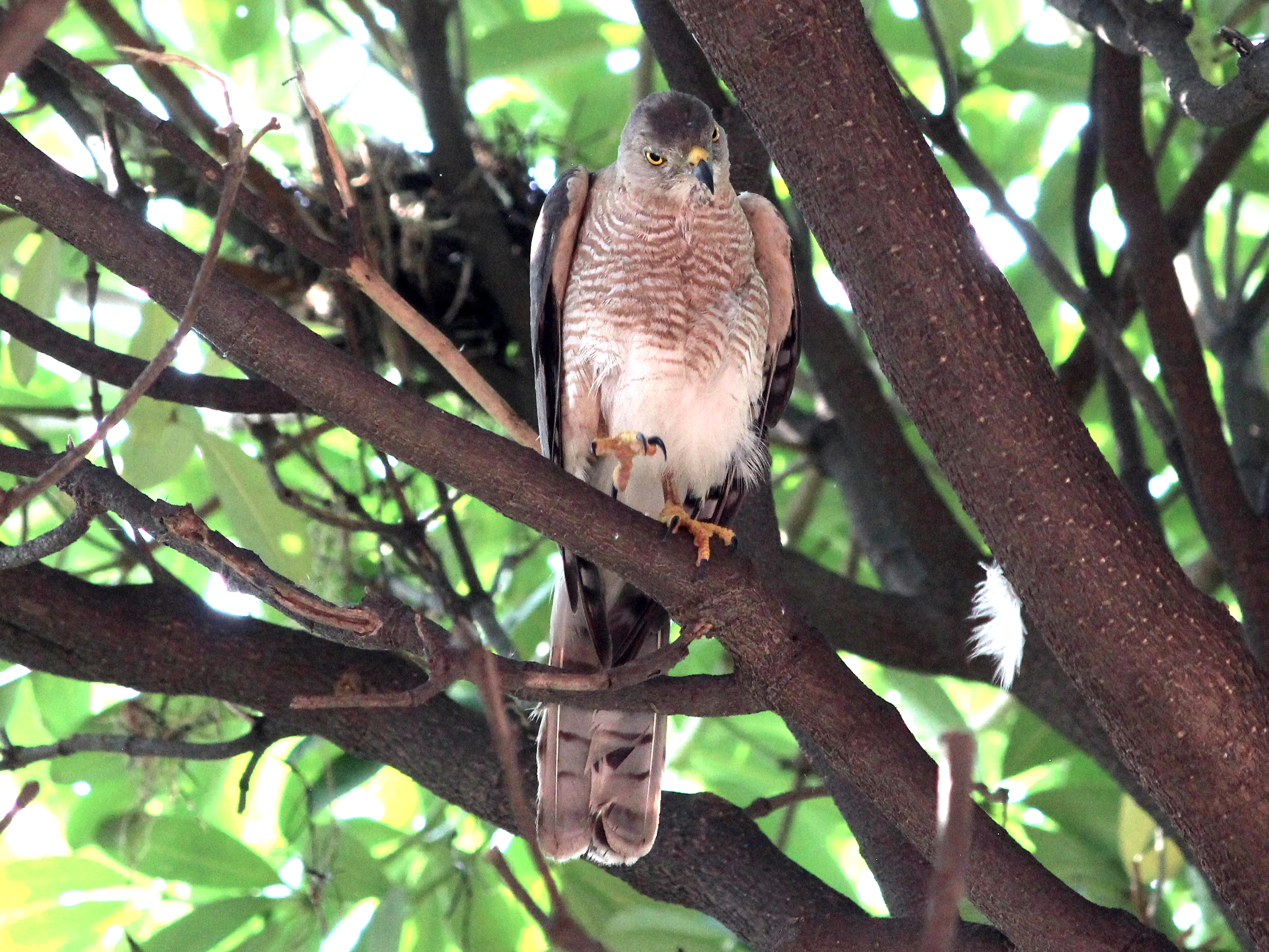
In Chandigarh
