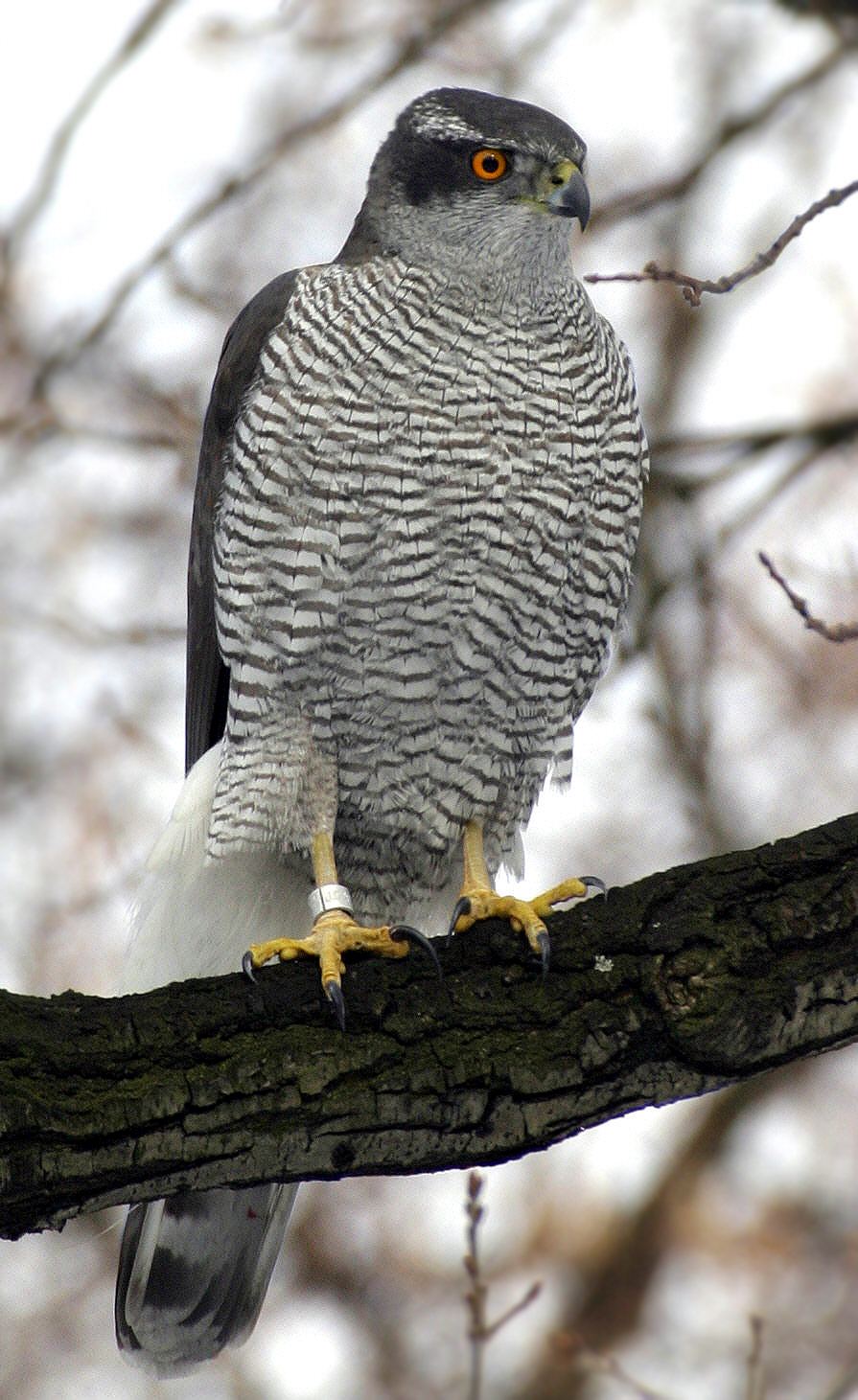
- Adult Eurasian goshawk

Scientific classification
- Kingdom: Animalia
- Phylum: Chordata
- Class: Aves
- Order: Accipitriformes
- Family: Accipitridae

= Hawk =

Bird of prey

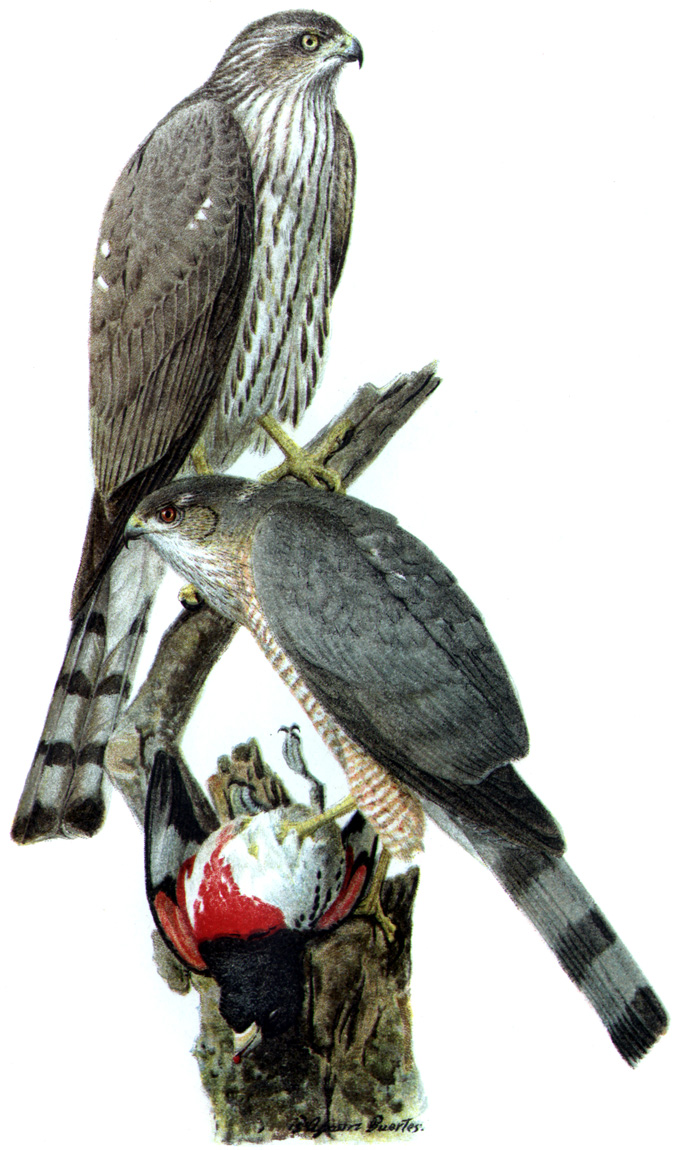
Sharp-shinned hawk, a small member of the Accipitrinae subfamily

Hawks are birds of prey of the family Accipitridae. They are very widely distributed and are found on all continents, except Antarctica.

The subfamily Accipitrinae includes goshawks, sparrowhawks, sharp-shinned hawks, and others. This subfamily are mainly woodland birds with short broad wings, long tails, and high visual acuity. They hunt by dashing suddenly from a concealed perch.

In the United States, members of the Buteo group are also called hawks, though birds of this group are called buzzards in other parts of the world. Generally, buteos have broad wings and sturdy builds. They are relatively larger-winged and shorter-tailed than accipiters, and fly further distances in open areas. Buteos descend or pounce on their prey rather than engaging in fast, horizontal pursuit.

The terms accipitrine hawk and buteonine hawk are used to distinguish between the types in regions where hawk applies to both. The term "true hawk" is sometimes used for the accipitrine hawks in regions where buzzard is preferred for the buteonine hawks.

All these groups are members of the family Accipitridae, which includes hawks and buzzards as well as kites, harriers, and eagles. To confuse things further, some authors use "hawk" generally for any small to medium Accipitrid that is not an eagle.

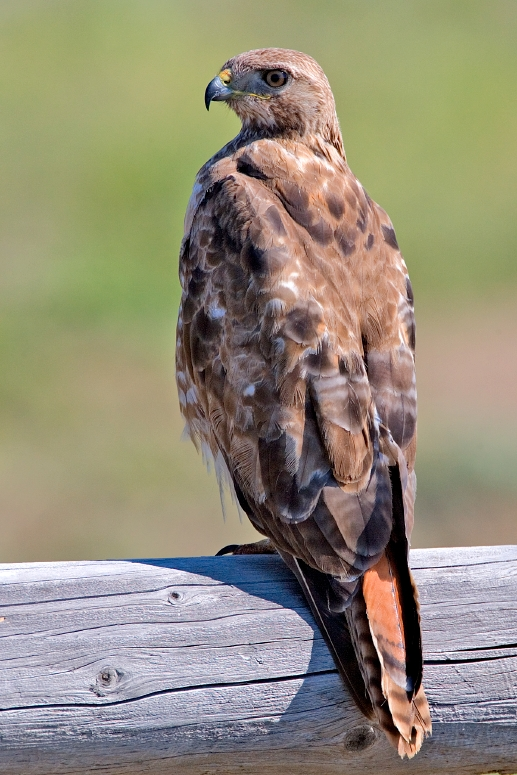
A Red-tailed hawk (Buteo jamaicensis), a member of the Buteo group

The common names of some birds include the term "hawk", reflecting traditional usage rather than taxonomy. For example, some people call an osprey a "fish hawk" or a peregrine falcon a "duck hawk".

== History ==
Falconry was once called "hawking", and any bird used for falconry could be referred to as a hawk.

Aristotle listed eleven types of ἱέρακες (hierakes, hawks; singular ἱέραξ, hierax): aisalōn (merlin), asterias, hypotriorchēs, kirkos, leios, perkos, phassophonos, phrynologos, pternis, spizias, and triorchēs. Pliny numbered sixteen kinds of hawks, but named only aigithos, epileios, kenchrēïs (kestrel), kybindis, and triorchēs (buzzard).

== Groups ==
=== Accipiterine group ===
Accipitrine hawks generally hunt other birds as their primary prey and thus are sometimes called "hen-hawks". Similarly, they are sometimes called "wood-hawks" because of their woodland habitat. Though they are also known as "true hawks" With most being called "sparrowhawks" or "goshawks" with the both being named such because of them hunting small birds (like sparrow) and large water-fowl (like goose) respectively

The subfamily Accipitrinae contains the genus Accipiter as well as the genera Micronisus (Gabar goshawk), Urotriorchis (long-tailed hawk), and Megatriorchis (Doria's goshawk). Melierax (chanting goshawk) may be included in the subfamily or given a subfamily of its own.

Erythrotriorchis (red- and chestnut-shouldered goshawk) is traditionally included in Accipitridae, but is possibly a convergent genus from an unrelated group (see red goshawk taxonomy).

=== Buteonine group ===
The "Buteonine group" includes genera Buteo, Parabuteo, Geranoetus, and most of Leucopternis. Members of this group have also been called "hawk-buzzards".

The proposed new genera Morphnarchus, Rupornis, and Pseudastur would be formed from members of Buteo and Leucopternis.

Members of the "Buteogallus group" are also called hawks, with the exception of solitary eagle species. Buteo is the type genus of the subfamily Buteoninae. This subfamily traditionally includes eagles and sea-eagles, but Lerner and Mindell (2005) proposed placing them into separate the subfamilies Aquilinae and Haliaaetinae. This would leave only the buteonine hawks/buzzards in Buteoninae.

== Characteristics ==
Screaming Hawk
Scream of a hawk.

=== Intelligence ===
In February 2005, Canadian ornithologist Louis Lefebvre announced a method of measuring avian "IQ" by measuring their innovation in feeding habits. Based on this scale, hawks were named among the most intelligent birds.

=== Eyesight ===
Hawks, like most birds, are tetrachromats with four types of colour receptors in the eye. Unlike some birds, but similar to other diurnal raptors, most hawk species are violet-sensitive but cannot perceive ultraviolet light. Hawks also have relatively high visual acuity – the distance at which they can resolve an image – with red-tailed hawks reported to have 16.8 cycles per degree. This is due to the large number of photoreceptors in the retina (up to 1,000,000 per square mm in Buteo, compared to 200,000 in humans), a high number of nerves connecting these receptors to the brain, and an indented fovea, which magnifies the central portion of the visual field. Hawks additionally have two foveae (depressions in the retina with high photoreceptor density) in each eye, one centrally-placed and the other temporally-placed. Finally, the eyeball is elongated, placing the lens far from the retina and giving a long focal length.

== Migration ==
Like most birds, hawks migrate in the autumn and the spring. The autumn migration season begins in August and ends mid-December, and different types of hawk choose different times in each season to migrate. Some migration distances are longer than others, and birds traveling longer distances tend to depart in early autumn while those traveling shorter distances start much later. Studies have shown that it is better for a hawk to arrive at its destination as early as possible to have first pick of mates, territory, food, and other resources.

There are a variety of factors impacting the strategy and success of a hawk's migration. Kerlinger states that a bird has more body fat when it begins its migration than when it arrives at its destination. Thus, the more fat a bird has when it begins its migration, the better its chances of making the trip safely. Flight path is another important factor in migration because a bird's route can greatly affect the conditions it encounters during its journey. For example, wind direction and speed can either throw the bird off course or push it in the right direction. Due to the relative variability of air conditions over large bodies of water and the resulting impact on safety, hawks tend to avoid any large bodies of water while migrating by detouring around lakes or flying along coasts.

Hawkwatching is a citizen scientist activity that monitors hawk migration and provides data to the scientific community.

== Habitat and distribution ==
The red-tailed hawk is probably the most common hawk in North America.

Past observations have indicated that, while hawks can easily adapt to most environments, they prefer open habitats such as deserts and fields, likely because it is easier to spot prey. As they are able to live anywhere, they can also be found in mountainous plains and tropical, moist areas such as Central America, the West Indies, and Jamaica.

== Behavior ==
Perch Hunting. This perching hawk located, captured and returned with prey at sunset

Parents feed young hawks from early in their lives until they leave the nest. Young hawks, while still in the fledgling phase, will leave their nests as early as six weeks old, but they do not hunt until they are older. Like most birds of prey, hawks kill their prey with their talons. Hawks usually prefer hunting just before nightfall when daylight lessens. Although hawks are known for being violent predators, some are gentle and quiet.

Hawks fly by flapping their wings rapidly then relying on momentum to glide through the air. Like other birds, they are known to form flocks when migrating, which improves survival rates over traveling alone. Flocks of birds, especially hawks, are sometimes called "kettles" in the United States.

== Reproduction ==
Hawks are known for their unique mating season and means of reproduction.

Some species of hawk are monogamous and have one partner their whole lives. The male and female of a mating pair build their nest before mating season then improve it throughout nesting season. They usually do this before mating.

Hawks have a striking mating ritual. First, a male and a female fly together in a circular motion. Once they reach a certain height, the male dives toward the female before ascending back to that height. The two birds repeat this until the male latches onto the female, and they begin to free-fall towards the ground.

In one year, a female hawk will lay about five eggs. Both the male and the female guard and care for the eggs for about a month until they hatch.

== Diet ==
Red-tailed hawk removing fur from a rodent before eating it, Mission Peak Regional Preserve, California

Hawks feed on a variety of smaller animals such as snakes, lizards, fish, mice, rabbits, squirrels, birds, or any other type of small game that is found on the ground. As an example, red-shouldered hawks eat smaller birds like doves as well as bugs like grasshoppers and crickets.

== In culture ==
The term war hawk, or simply hawk, is used in politics to describe someone perceived as favoring war. The term reportedly originated in the United States during the 1810 debates in Congress over a possible war with Great Britain. Congressman John Randolph is said to have referred to Henry Clay's pro-war faction as the "war-hawks". Those who are politically opposed to war or philosophically advocate peace are referred to as doves.

Numerous sporting clubs, such as the Atlanta Hawks, the Hawthorn Hawks, and the Malmö Redhawks, use the bird as an emblem. The sports teams of Miami University in Oxford, Ohio officially became known as the RedHawks in 1997 after changing the name from Redskins. The sports teams of Saint Joseph's University in Philadelphia use the Hawk as an emblem for sports teams as well for students and graduates. The University of Iowa uses the name Hawkeyes for their sports teams, with Herky the Hawk being the schools mascot and a hawk head being the schools sports logo.

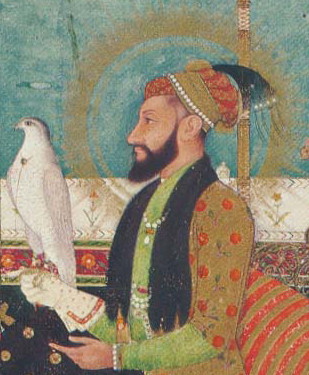
Mughal Emperor Aurangzeb holding a hawk in his darbar

Hawks are strongly associated with Guru Gobind Singh in the Sikh community. He is believed to have kept a white Northern Goshawk. As a result, the Northern Goshawk was made the official state bird of Punjab, India.

In Korea, from the early Joseon period, hawks and other birds of prey were associated with a branch of government known as the Imperial Censorate, suggesting the qualities of courage and a keen sense of justice. Artists such as Chŏng Hongnae specialised in portraying hawks for royalty, and his Hawk at Sunrise is in the collection of the Metropolitan Museum of Art.
