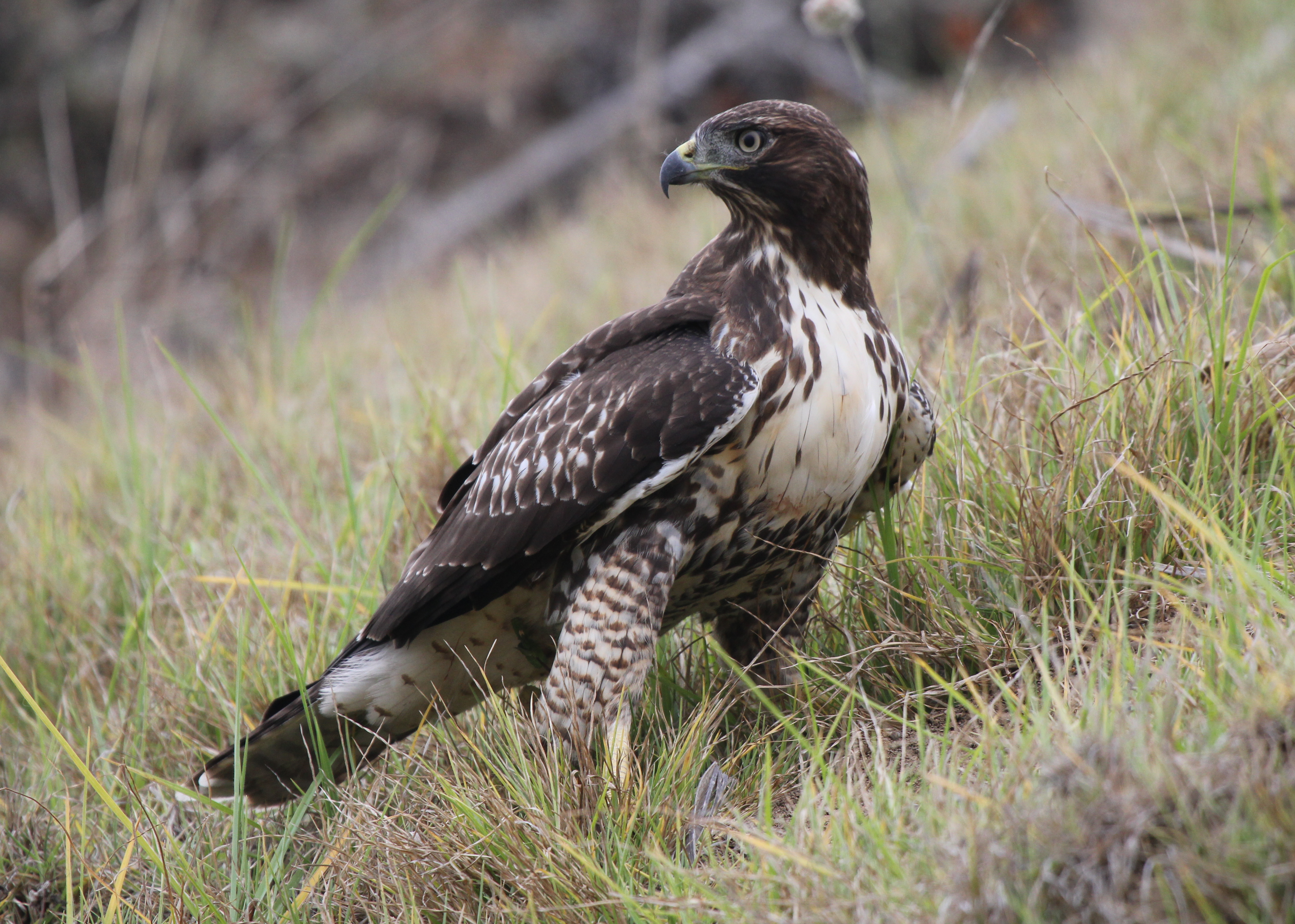
- Western red-tailed hawk (Buteo jamaicensis calurus)

Scientific classification
- Kingdom: Animalia
- Phylum: Chordata
- Class: Aves
- Order: Accipitriformes
- Family: Accipitridae
- Subfamily: Buteoninae; Vigors, 1825

Genera
- About 19, see article

= Buteoninae =

Subfamily of birds

The Buteoninae are a subfamily of birds of prey which consists of medium to large, broad-winged species.

They have large, powerful, hooked beaks for tearing flesh from their prey, strong legs, and powerful talons. They also have extremely keen eyesight to enable them to spot potential prey from a distance.

This subfamily contains the buzzards (buteonine hawks) with great diversity in appearance and form and some appearing eagle-like, with at least 50 species included overall in the subfamily. At one time, several types were grouped, including large assemblages such as booted eagles, but modern studies using mitochondrial DNA clarified that this subfamily was smaller than formerly classified.

== Systematics ==
The subfamily Buteoninae was introduced (as "Buteonina") by the Irish zoologist Nicholas Vigors in 1825 with Buteo as the type genus. The subfamily includes about 79 currently recognized species. Unlike the many lineages of Accipitridae which seem to have radiated out of Africa or South Asia, the Buteoninae clearly originated in the Americas based on fossil records and current species distributions (more than 75% of the extant raptors from this lineage are found in the Americas).

A genus level cladogram of the Buteoninae is shown below. It is based on a molecular phylogenetic study of the family Accipitridae by Therese Catanach and collaborators that was published in 2024.

- Buteoninae
  - Milvini
    - - Milvus – kites (3 species - with split of yellow-billed)
      - Haliastur – kites (2 species)
    - - Haliaeetus – sea and fish eagles (4 species)
      - Icthyophaga – sea and fish eagles (6 species)
  - Buteonini
    - Butastur – buzzards (4 species)
    - - Ictinia – kites (2 species)
      - - - Geranospiza – crane hawk
          - - Busarellus – black-collared hawk
            - - Rostrhamus – snail kite
              - Helicolestes – slender-billed kite
        - - - Morphnarchus – barred hawk
            - - Cryptoleucopteryx – plumbeous hawk
              - Buteogallus – hawks and eagles (9 species)
          - - - Rupornis – roadside hawk (placement uncertain)
              - Parabuteo – hawks (2 species)
            - - - Geranoaetus – hawks and eagles (3 species)
                - Pseudastur – hawks (3 species)
              - - Leucopternis – hawks (3 species)
                - Buteo – hawks and buzzards (28 species)

=== Genera ===
Tribe	Image	Genus	Species
Milvini Vigors 1824-milvine kites and sea and fish eagles.		Milvus Lacépède, 1799	Red kite, Milvus milvus; Cape Verde kite, Milvus (milvus) fasciicauda extinct (2000); Black kite, Milvus migrans; Black-eared kite, Milvus (migrans) lineatus; Yellow-billed kite, Milvus aegyptius
Milvini Vigors 1824-milvine kites and sea and fish eagles.		Haliastur Selby, 1840	Brahminy kite, Haliastur indus; Whistling kite, Haliastur sphenurus
Milvini Vigors 1824-milvine kites and sea and fish eagles.		Haliaeetus Savigny, 1809	Steller's sea eagle Haliaeetus pelagicus; Pallas's fish eagle Haliaeetus leucoryphus; White-tailed eagle Haliaeetus albicilla; Bald eagle Haliaeetus leucocephalus
Milvini Vigors 1824-milvine kites and sea and fish eagles.		Icthyophaga Lesson, 1843	White-bellied sea eagle Icthyophaga leucogaster; Sanford's sea eagle Icthyophaga sanfordi; African fish eagle Icthyophaga vocifer; Madagascar fish eagle Icthyophaga vociferoides; Grey-headed fish eagle Icthyophaga ichthyaetus; Lesser fish eagle Icthyophaga humilis
Buteonini Vigors 1824		Butastur Hodgson, 1843	Rufous-winged buzzard (B. liventer); Grasshopper buzzard (B. rufipennis); White-eyed buzzard (B. teesa); Grey-faced buzzard (B. indicus)
Buteonini Vigors 1824		Ictinia Vieillot, 1816	Mississippi kite (Ictinia mississippiensis); Plumbeous kite (Ictinia plumbea)
Buteonini Vigors 1824		Geranospiza Kaup, 1847	Crane hawk (Geranospiza caerulescens)
Buteonini Vigors 1824		Busarellus Lesson, 1843	Black-collared hawk (Busarellus nigricollis)
Buteonini Vigors 1824		Rostrhamus Lesson, 1830	Snail kite (Rostrhamus sociabilis)
Buteonini Vigors 1824		Helicolestes Bangs & Penard, 1918	Slender-billed kite (Helicolestes hamatus)
Buteonini Vigors 1824		Morphnarchus Ridgway, 1920	Barred hawk (Morphnarchus princeps)
Buteonini Vigors 1824		Cryptoleucopteryx Amaral et al., 2009	Plumbeous hawk (Cryptoleucopteryx plumbea)
Buteonini Vigors 1824		Buteogallus Lesson, 1830	Slate-colored hawk Buteogallus schistaceus; White-necked hawk Buteogallus lacernulatus; Rufous crab hawk, Buteogallus aequinoctialis; Common black hawk, Buteogallus anthracinus; Mangrove black hawk, Buteogallus (anthracinus) subtilis – formerly considered a distinct species, but now considered a subspecies.; Cuban black hawk, Buteogallus gundlachii – formerly included in B. anthracinus; Great black hawk, Buteogallus urubitinga; Savanna hawk, Buteogallus meridionalis; Chaco eagle, Buteogallus coronatus; Solitary eagle, Buteogallus solitarius
Buteonini Vigors 1824		Rupornis Kaup, 1844	Roadside hawk (Rupornis magnirostris)
Buteonini Vigors 1824		Parabuteo Ridgway, 1874	Harris's hawk (Parabuteo unicinctus); White-rumped hawk (Parabuteo leucorrhous)
Buteonini Vigors 1824		Geranoaetus Kaup, 1844	White-tailed hawk (Geranoaetus albicaudatus); Variable hawk (Geranoaetus polyosoma); Black-chested buzzard-eagle (Geranoaetus melanoleucus)
Buteonini Vigors 1824		Pseudastur Blyth, 1849	Mantled hawk (Pseudastur polionotus); White hawk (Pseudastur albicollis); Gray-backed hawk (Pseudastur occidentalis)
Buteonini Vigors 1824		Leucopternis Kaup, 1847	Semiplumbeous hawk (Leucopternis semiplumbeus); Black-faced hawk (Leucopternis melanops); White-browed hawk (Leucopternis kuhli)
Buteonini Vigors 1824		Buteo Lacépède, 1799	Common buzzard, Buteo buteo; Eastern buzzard, Buteo japonicus; Himalayan buzzard, Buteo refectus; Cape Verde buzzard, Buteo bannermani; Socotra buzzard, Buteo socotraensis; Red-tailed hawk, Buteo jamaicensis; Long-legged buzzard, Buteo rufinus; Rough-legged buzzard, Buteo lagopus; Ferruginous hawk, Buteo regalis; Red-shouldered hawk, Buteo lineatus; Broad-winged hawk, Buteo platypterus; Swainson's hawk, Buteo swainsoni; Ridgway's hawk, Buteo ridgwayi; Short-tailed hawk, Buteo brachyurus; White-throated hawk, Buteo albigula; Galápagos hawk, Buteo galapagoensis; Gray-lined hawk, Buteo nitidus; Gray hawk, Buteo plagiatus; Zone-tailed hawk, Buteo albonotatus; Hawaiian hawk, Buteo solitarius; Rufous-tailed hawk, Buteo ventralis; Mountain buzzard, Buteo oreophilus; Forest buzzard, Buteo trizonatus; Madagascar buzzard, Buteo brachypterus; Upland buzzard, Buteo hemilasius; Red-necked buzzard, Buteo auguralis; Jackal buzzard, Buteo rufofuscus; Augur buzzard, Buteo augur

=== Extinct Genera ===
- †Bermuteo Olson, 2008
- †Garganoaetus Ballmann, 1973
