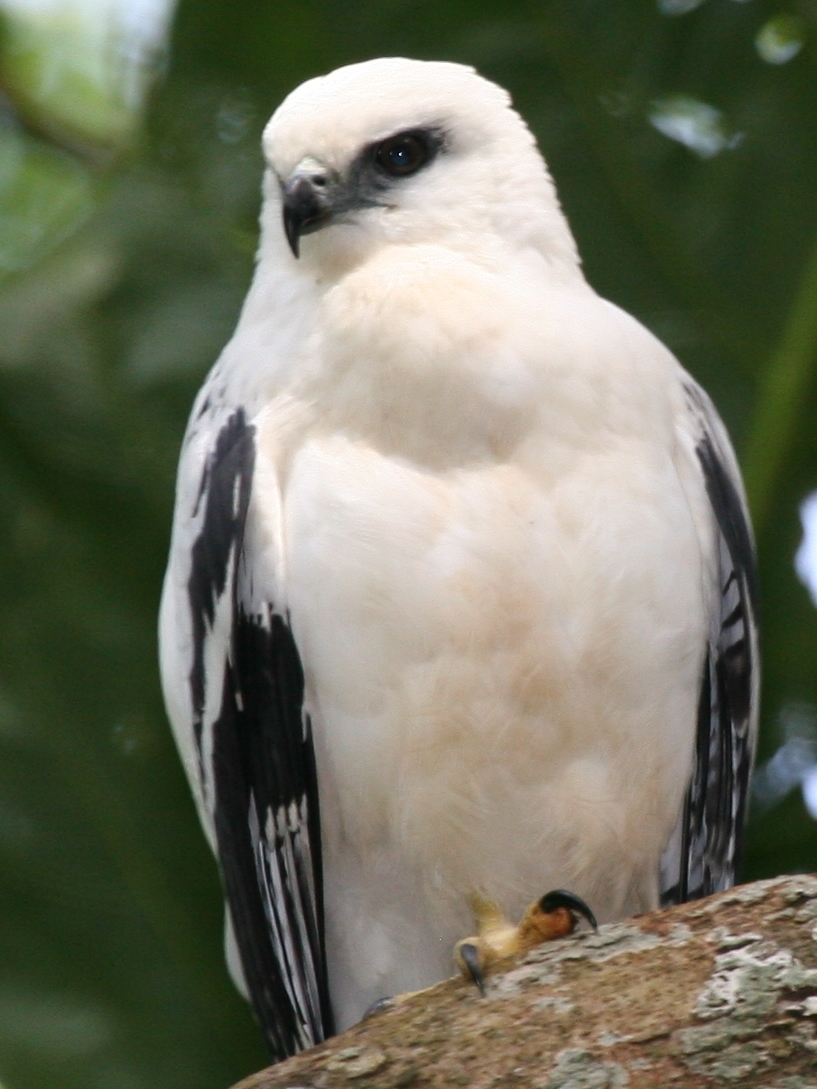

Conservation status
- Least Concern (IUCN 3.1)

Scientific classification
- Kingdom: Animalia
- Phylum: Chordata
- Class: Aves
- Order: Accipitriformes
- Family: Accipitridae
- Genus: Pseudastur
- Species: P. albicollis

Binomial name
- Pseudastur albicollis (Latham, 1790)

Subspecies
- P. a. ghiesbreghti - (Du Bus de Gisignies, 1845); P. a. costaricensis - (Sclater, WL, 1919); P. a. williaminae - (Meyer de Schauensee, 1950); P. a. albicollis - (Latham, 1790)

Synonyms
- Leucopternis albicollis

= White hawk =

Species of bird

The white hawk (Pseudastur albicollis) is a bird of prey breeding in the tropical New World of the family Accipitridae. Though it is commonly placed in the subfamily Buteoninae, the validity of this group is doubtful and currently under review.

== Description ==
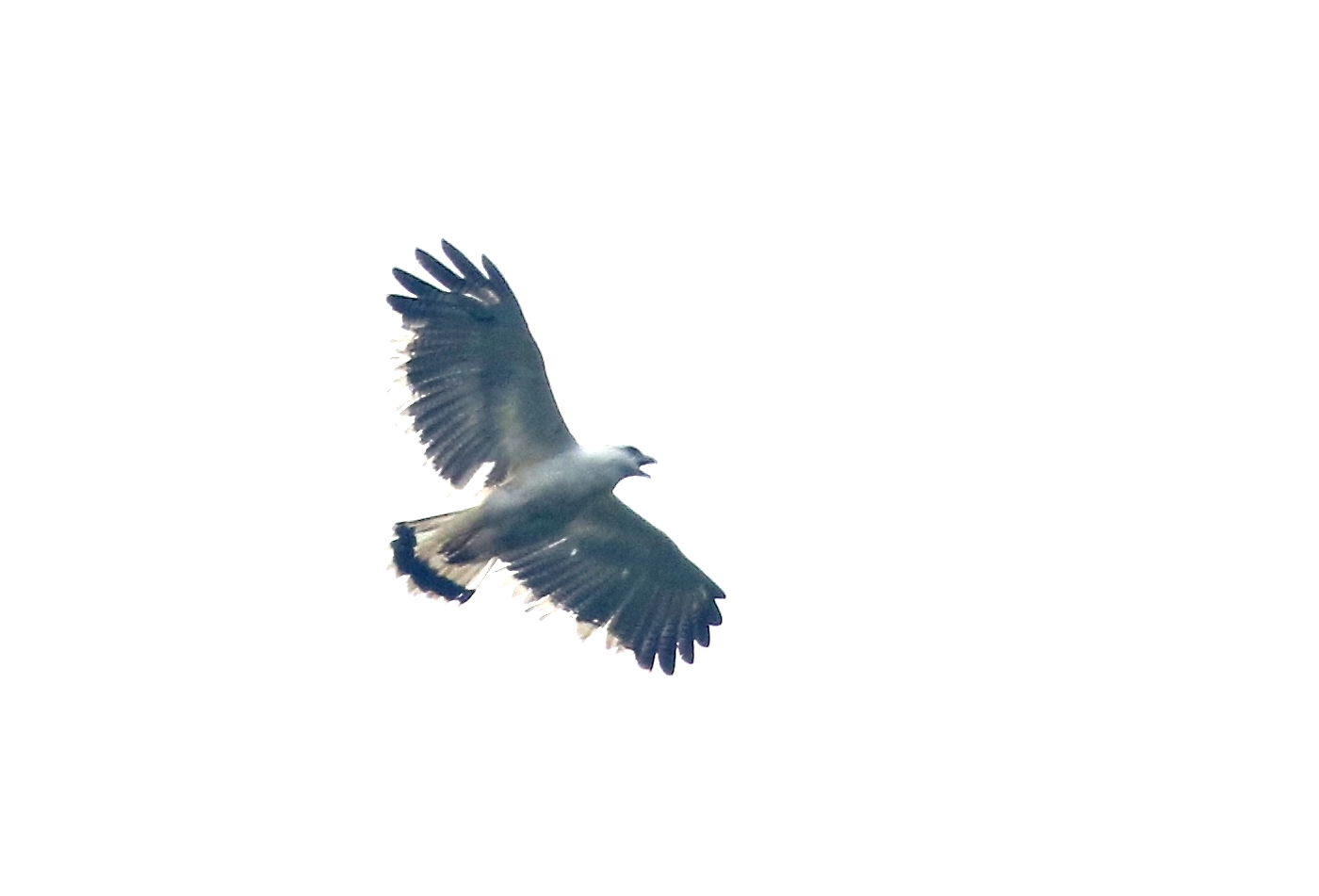
Jordanal - El Valle, Panama

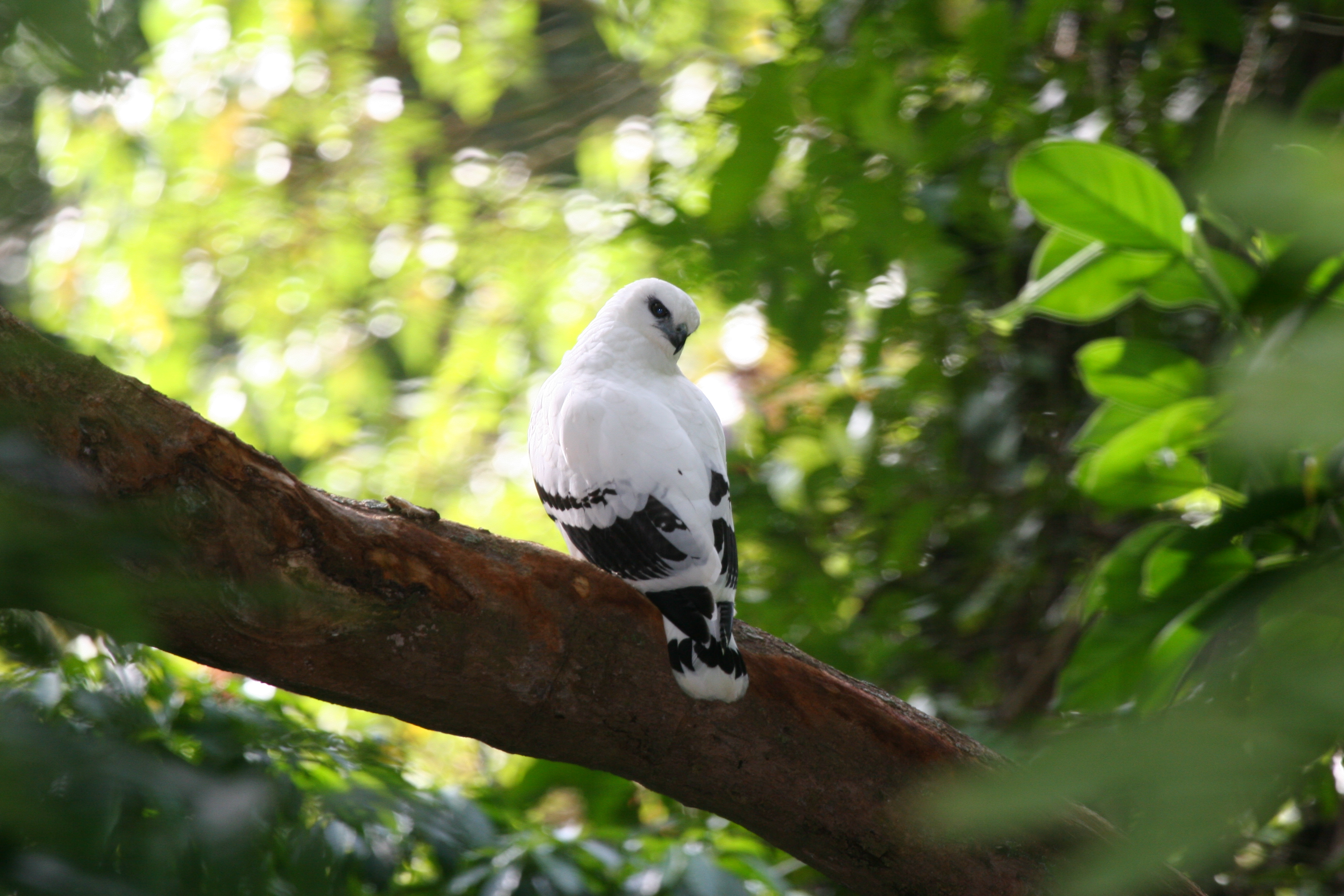
Adult Pseudastur albicollis costaricensis in Honduras

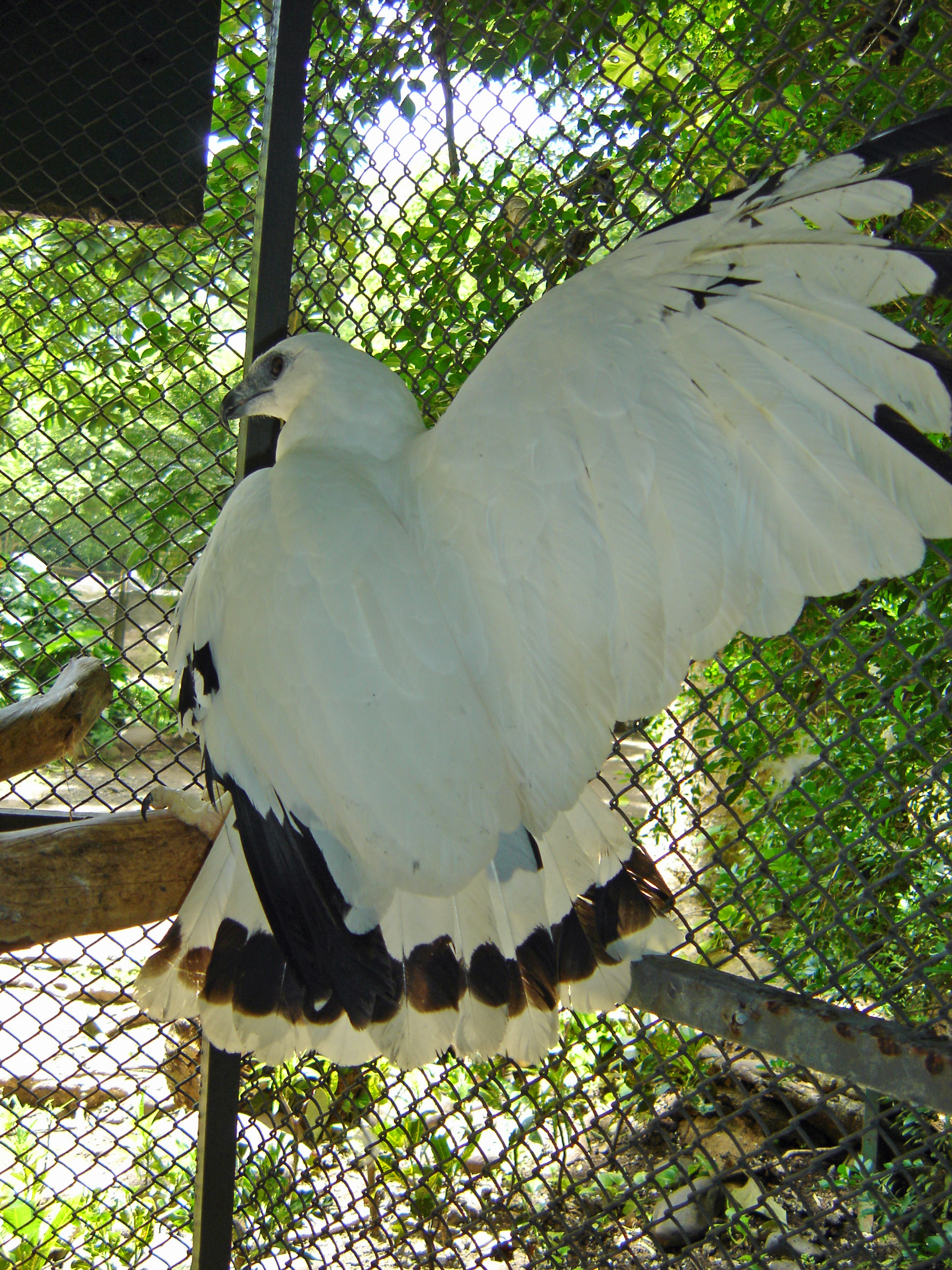
Adult Pseudastur albicollis ghiesbreghti

The adult white hawk ranges from 46–56 cm (18–22 in) long with very broad wings and has a white head, body and underwings. The upper wings are black, and the very short tail is black with a broad white band. The bill is black and the legs are yellow.

The sexes are similar, but females are larger and heavier—840 g (1.85 lb) compared to the male's 650 g (1.43 lb). Immature birds have extensive black spotting on the upperparts and dark-streaked whitish underparts.

The call of the white hawk is a plaintive kerwee.

=== Subspecies ===
There are four subspecies:

- Pseudastur albicollis ghiesbreghti – Southern Mexico to Nicaragua

Entirely white, except for black markings on the outer primaries, and a black sub-terminal tail bar. The eyes are yellow.

- Pseudastur albicollis costaricensis – Honduras to Panama and Colombia.

Similar to ghiesbreghti but with more distinct black markings on the wings and tail. The eyes are brown.

- Pseudastur albicollis williaminae – Locally in north-western Colombia and western Venezuela.

Wing feathers are more heavily marked with black, and it has black streaks on the crown and collar. The tail band is broader and the eyes are brown.

- Pseudastur albicollis albicollis – Northern Colombia and central Venezuela to Brazil.

Smaller than the northern forms and the wings are mostly black, with white markings. The black tail band extends to the base of the tail and the eyes are brown.

All subspecies look mainly white from below. The identity of the birds discovered in 2000/2001 in the Serranía de las Quinchas of central Colombia is unclear.

== Systematics ==
The white hawk was described by John Latham: in English (1787) as the "white-necked falcon", and in Latin (1790) as Falco albicollis, with locality "Cayenne". Around 1850, Edward Blyth created the genus Pseudaster, with "Falco pæcilonotus Cuvier" as the type and "F.skotopterus Pr. Max." as a synonym. In his Genera of Birds, Gray treats them both as Buteos, listing B. albicollis in the main text and B. pæcilonotus in the index.

Peters' influential 1931 checklist placed the white hawk in Kaup's genus Leucopternis, listing five subspecies: L. albicollis albicollis, L. a. ghiesbrechti, L. a. costaricensis, L. a. occidentalis, and L. a. polionota. During the 20th century, some authors treated the grey-backed hawk occidentalis as a subspecies of L. albicollis, whilst others recognized it as a separate species.

In the first decade of the 2000s Leucopternis was found to be polyphyletic, and in 2012 the American Ornithologists' Union separated the white hawk and its relatives under the old name Pseudaster.

DNA analysis found that the subspecies P. a. albicollis is sister to P. a. polionotus, and the trans-Andean P. a. ghiesbreghti and P. a. costaricensis are more closely related to P. occidentalis than they are to P. a. albicollis.

== Distribution and ecology ==
This is a bird of lowland forest and other woodlands. It ranges from southern Mexico through Central and South America to Peru, Bolivia and Brazil. It also breeds on Trinidad. The white hawk's range in central South America is the entire Amazon basin, from the Andes on the west to the Guianas on the Atlantic on the northeast, and to the transition lands to the south. A widespread species, it is usually not common, but the IUCN considers it not to be globally threatened due to the large extent of its range.

The white hawk feeds mainly on reptiles (such as lizards and snakes, including the eastern coral snake) with some insects (such as beetles and grasshoppers), crabs, amphibians and mammals (including rats, squirrels, small opossums and bats), caught in a sortie from a perch. Researchers have documented the white hawk feeding on a number of bird species including the keel-billed toucan, the mottled owl, the white-breasted wood wren and the great tinamou. They may feed on young and weak birds, as well. Though rare, there is some evidence that this hawk may occasionally feed on fish. One researcher in Suriname found remains of a fish in a white hawk's stomach. It associates with foraging groups of tufted capuchin monkeys (Cebus apella) and South American coatis (Nasua nasua) to snatch prey startled by these animals. This species is often seen soaring, and has a spectacular aerial courtship display.

It builds a large stick platform nest in a tree and usually lays one dark-blotched blue-white egg. An attended nest was observed in Ecuador in mid-August.
