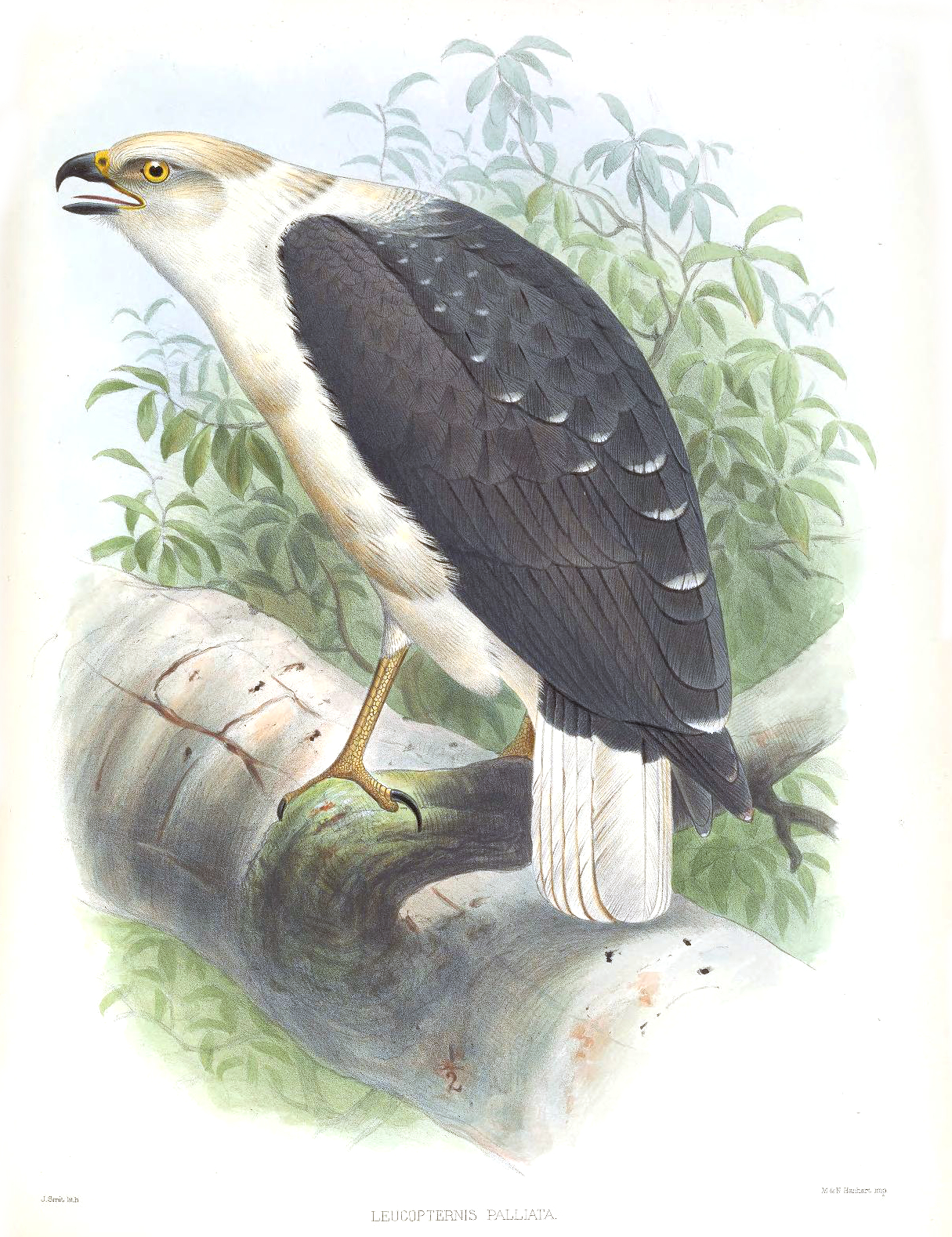

Conservation status
- Near Threatened (IUCN 3.1)

Scientific classification
- Kingdom: Animalia
- Phylum: Chordata
- Class: Aves
- Order: Accipitriformes
- Family: Accipitridae
- Genus: Pseudastur
- Species: P. polionotus

Binomial name
- Pseudastur polionotus (Kaup, 1847)

Synonyms
- Leucopternis polionota (lapsus); Leucopternis polionotus

= Mantled hawk =

Species of bird

The mantled hawk (Pseudastur polionotus) is a South American species of bird of prey in the family Accipitridae.

== Taxonomy and evolution ==
This hawk was formerly placed in the genus Leucopternis and was known as Leucopternis polionota or polionotus but is now classified as Pseudastur polionotus.

== Description ==
The adult of this medium-sized hawk has a bulky appearance with broad "shoulders" relative to total length. The body length measures 470-510mm, with females being slightly larger than males. The head, neck, upper back and entire undersurface except for the black wing tips and basal half of the tail are white. The white round head appears disproportionately large relative to the rest of the body and sometimes projects further than the tail. There are also markings around eyes, giving a masked appearance. The ceres and lores are grey or dull yellow. The bill is pale grey, gradually turning black at the tip. The iris is brown but often appears black in the field. The toes and tarsi are orange-yellow.

The wings, lower back and rump are black or dark bluish grey, with the dark primaries, secondaries, tertials and upper tail coverts having greyish bases with thin white square tips. They also have 3-4 narrow darker bands and the broad white tips form a shallow U when seen from behind. The mantle, scapulars and upper tail coverts are also black or slate grey with broad white tips, but with the coverts appearing darker than the scapulars and are tipped white, sometimes giving a barred appearance.

When perched, the long primaries reach or exceed the tail tip. The long secondaries reach halfway to the tail tip and conceal the rump and base of tail, which makes the tail appear very short.

In flight, this hawk glides on level wings and soars frequently throughout the day, though it is easily spotted when perched at exposed positions at distances over 1 km. When the hawk is seen in flight from below, only the white part of the square tail is visible; but in some individuals, one or two dark bands may be visible at the tail base. Overall, it is similar to the white-necked hawk in its appearance and flight pattern, but has a broad white leading edge on the wings and tail end, whereas this is black in the white-necked hawk. The dark tail base of the latter is however not usually seen in flight, making distinction between these two species difficult in the field. Flat wing length measurement has been reported as 360-380mm in males, and 390-410mm in females. Other reported measurements include a tail length of 178-222mm, tarsus length of 95.3mm, and culmen length from cere as 29-30mm.

The juvenile is similar to the adult but the plumage is fairly spotted overall, with dark streaks on the white crown and nape which are visible at a distance. The upper wing coverts are fringed whitish and there are dark bars at the base of the tail which are more numerous and noticeable than in adults. The cere ranges from whitish to dull yellow.

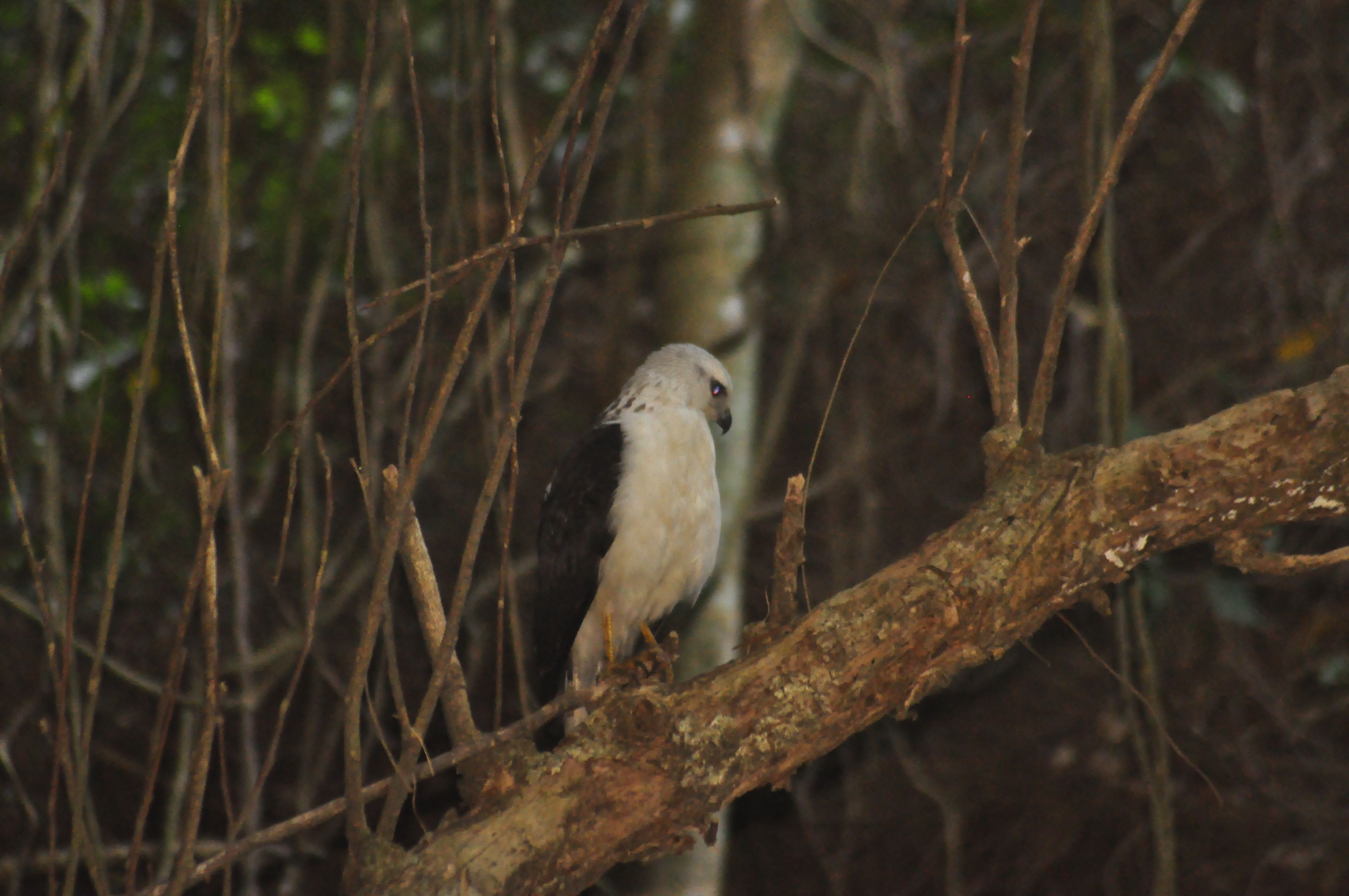

== Habitat and distribution ==
The mantled hawk has a small and patchy distribution within the Atlantic Forest of South America, but may generally occur at higher altitudes than similar species. It is endemic to lowland and montane forest fragments in eastern Brazil ranging from Alagoas and Bahia to Santa Catarina; southeast Paraguay in states such as Alto Paraná Department, Iguassu and Puerto Bertoni; and extreme northeast Argentina. It may also inhabit northern Uruguay.

Within its humid forest habitat, this hawk especially favours foothills and the elevation of its habitat ranges from sea level to at least 1500m. Alongside continuous evergreen forest, it also appears to use edges, natural clearings and patches of dry trees along surrounding hills. Areas of secondary growth and extensive deforestation are also used, especially in association with Parana Pine.

It is commonest in east Brazil, especially in the Parapiacaba fragment of the Atlantic Forest and rarer elsewhere, especially in east Uruguay and southeast Paraguay. It occurs at relatively low densities overall.

== Ecology ==
=== Feeding ===
Like many other hawks, the mantled hawk is a sit-and-wait predator. It rests on perches 5-7m aboveground in relatively exposed areas to give a clear view of potential prey in its surroundings for it to catch and ambush and these areas may include recently cleared patches of forest. It captures its prey after a short rapid flight from its perch, where it returns to eat it. Prey consists primarily of smaller birds such as tanagers, trogons, doves and rufous-sided crake. Other prey may include lizards, snakes and small rodents.

=== Threats ===
The population has become substantially reduced and fragmented through persistent deforestation of its habitat, particularly through exploitation of iron ore deposits. However, the threat from deforestation is considered to be less than for other hawk species such as white-necked hawk because of the former species' more upland and extensive range.

Although agricultural conversion and deforestation for mining and plantation production have led to large population declines, these are regarded as historical threats. Currents threats to the species include urbanisation, industrialisation, agricultural expansion, colonisation and associated road-building. However, this hawk may be able to adapt to patchworks of pine plantations and native forest. Its ability to persist in fragmented forests is a topic of ongoing investigation and an extension of the protected area network to include remaining core areas of forest, alongside increased protection of remaining forest patches, has been suggested.

== In culture and relation to humans ==
This raptor displays marked territorial behaviour in human presence, defending its territory against human intruders by regurgitating stomach contents or by pursuit. In human presence, mantled hawks are fairly vocal and call repeatedly, which makes them relatively easy to detect when present a few kilometres away.

== Status ==
This raptor has been evaluated as Near Threatened by the IUCN since 2004 because of the small and strongly declining population. The overall population is estimated at 3500-15000 individuals.
