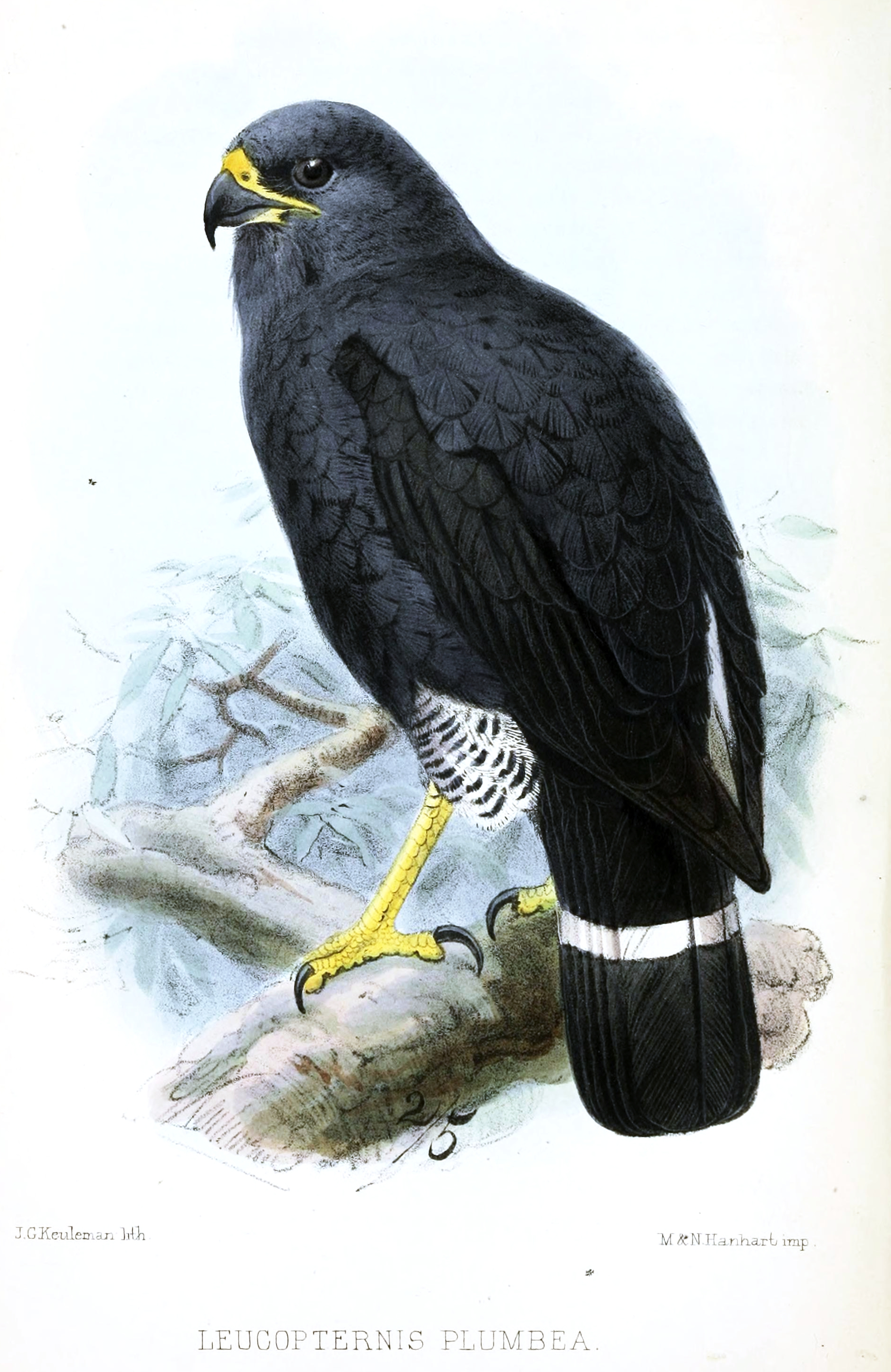

Conservation status
- Near Threatened (IUCN 3.1)

Scientific classification
- Kingdom: Animalia
- Phylum: Chordata
- Class: Aves
- Order: Accipitriformes
- Family: Accipitridae
- Subfamily: Buteoninae
- Genus: Cryptoleucopteryx; Amaral, Sheldon, Gamauf, Haring, Riesing, Silveira & Wajnta, 2009
- Species: C. plumbea

Binomial name
- Cryptoleucopteryx plumbea (Salvin, 1872)

Synonyms
- Leucopternis plumbeus Salvin, 1872

= Plumbeous hawk =

Species of bird

The plumbeous hawk (Cryptoleucopteryx plumbea) is a species of bird of prey in the family Accipitridae belonging to the monotypic genus Cryptoleucopteryx. It ranges 33 to 37 cm in length and 71 to 79 cm in wingspan.

== Systematics ==
The plumbeous hawk was described by English naturalist Osbert Salvin in 1872 under the protonym Leucopternis plumbea. As the genus Leucopternis is masculine in gender, the scientific name was revised to Leucopternis plumbeus to meet the International Code of Zoological Nomenclature.

== Distribution ==
The plumbeous hawk is found in Colombia, Ecuador, Panama, and northwestern Peru. Its natural habitat is subtropical or tropical moist lowland forests. It can also be found on silvopastures. The population is threatened by habitat loss resulting from agriculture, logging, and mining.

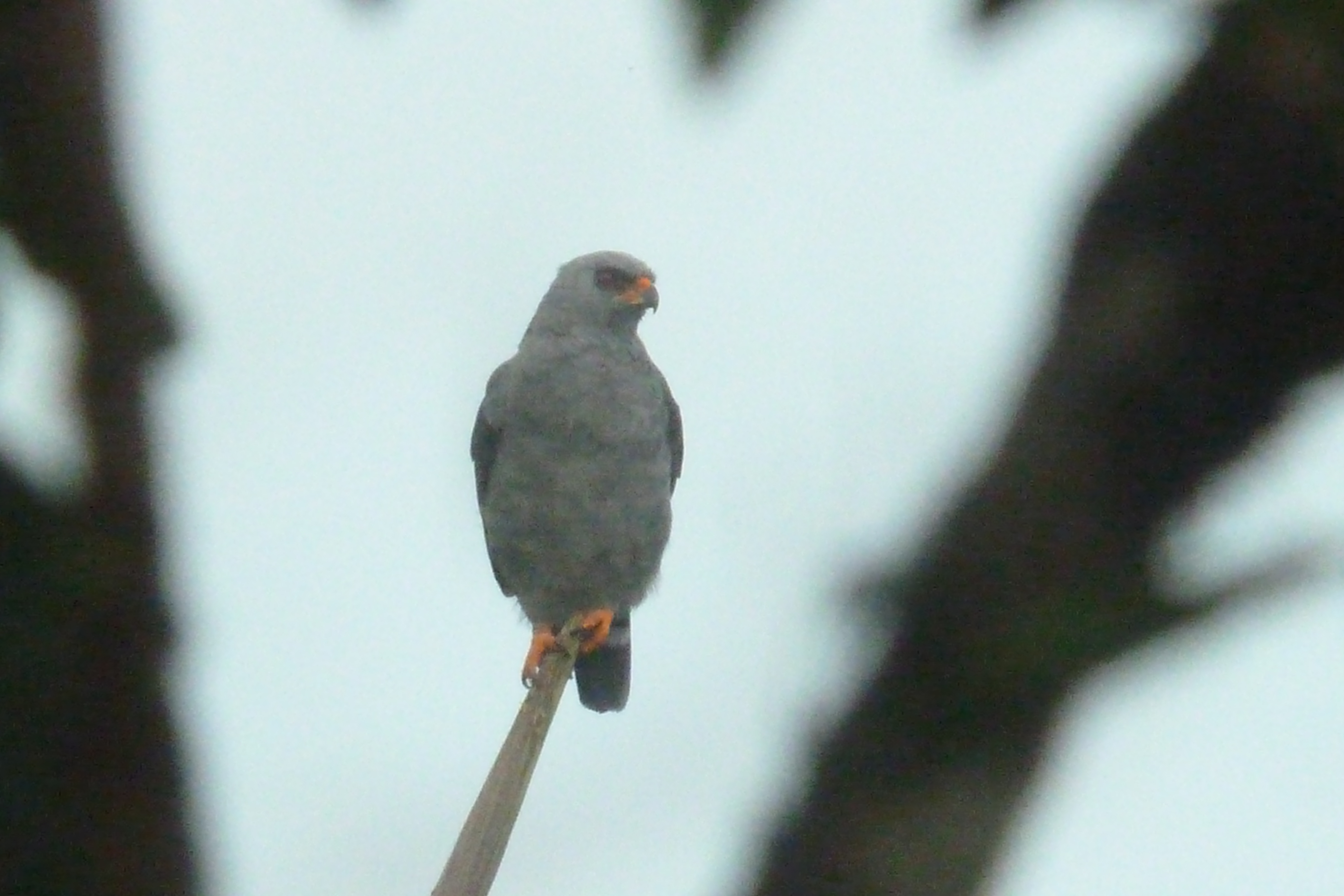

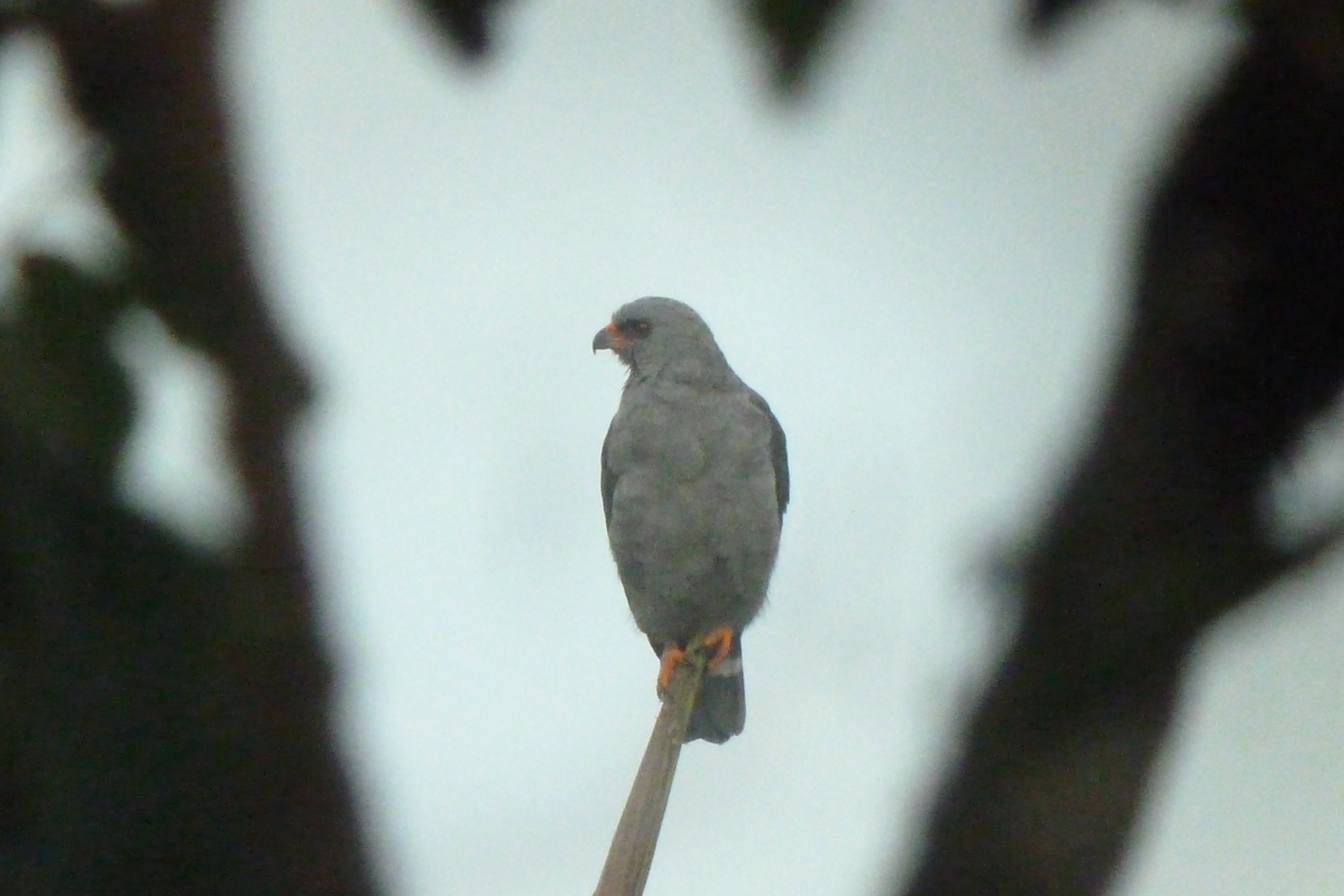
