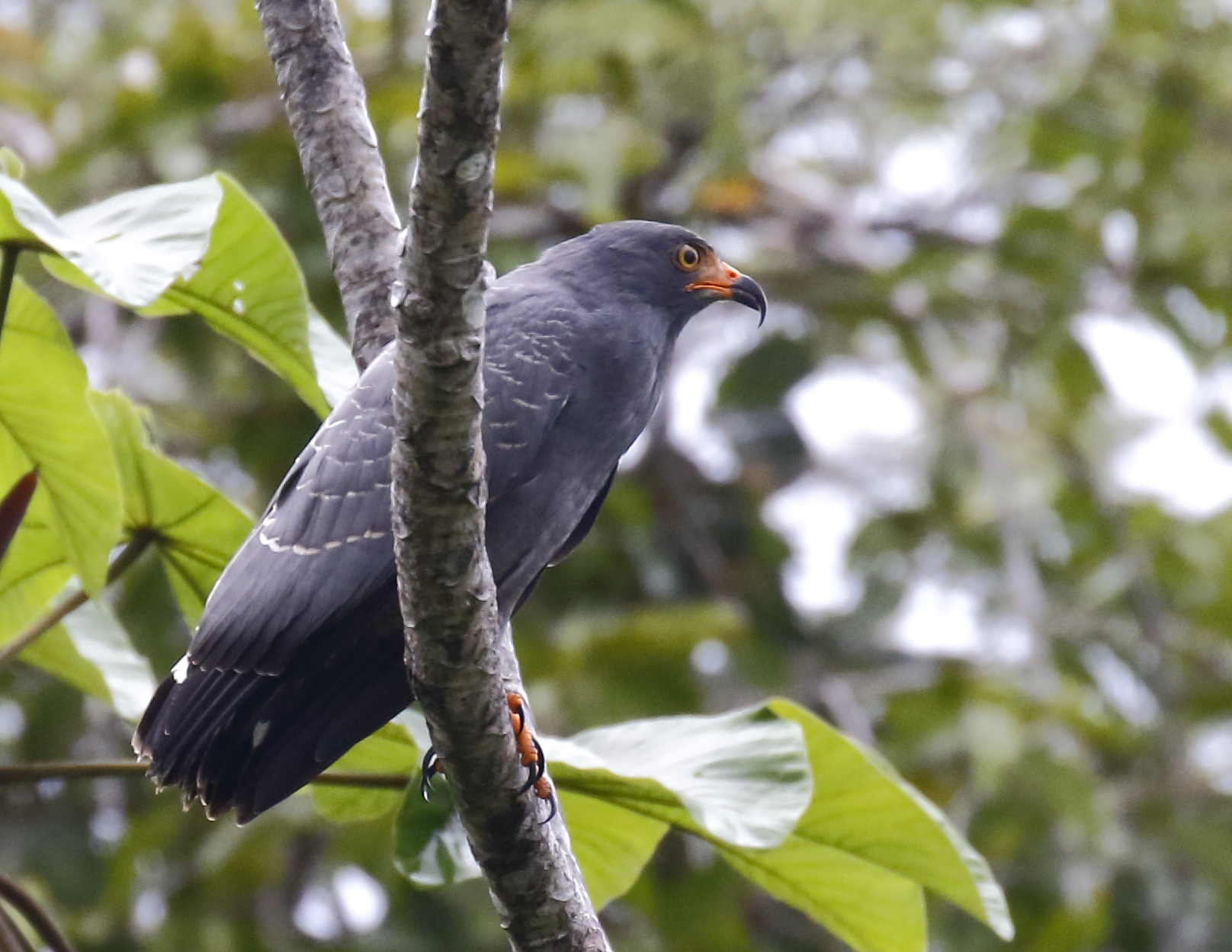
- A juvenile slender-billed kite at Careiro da Várzea, Amazonas state, Brazil

Conservation status
- Least Concern (IUCN 3.1)

Scientific classification
- Kingdom: Animalia
- Phylum: Chordata
- Class: Aves
- Order: Accipitriformes
- Family: Accipitridae
- Subfamily: Buteoninae
- Genus: Helicolestes; Bangs & Penard, 1918
- Species: H. hamatus

Binomial name
- Helicolestes hamatus (Temminck, 1821)

Synonyms
- Rostrhamus hamatus

= Slender-billed kite =

Species of bird

The slender-billed kite (Helicolestes hamatus) is a South American bird of prey in the family Accipitridae. It is found along a scattered range in forested parts of tropical northern and central South America, and far eastern Panama. The species was recategorized into and has once again been removed from the genus Rostrhamus.

== Description ==
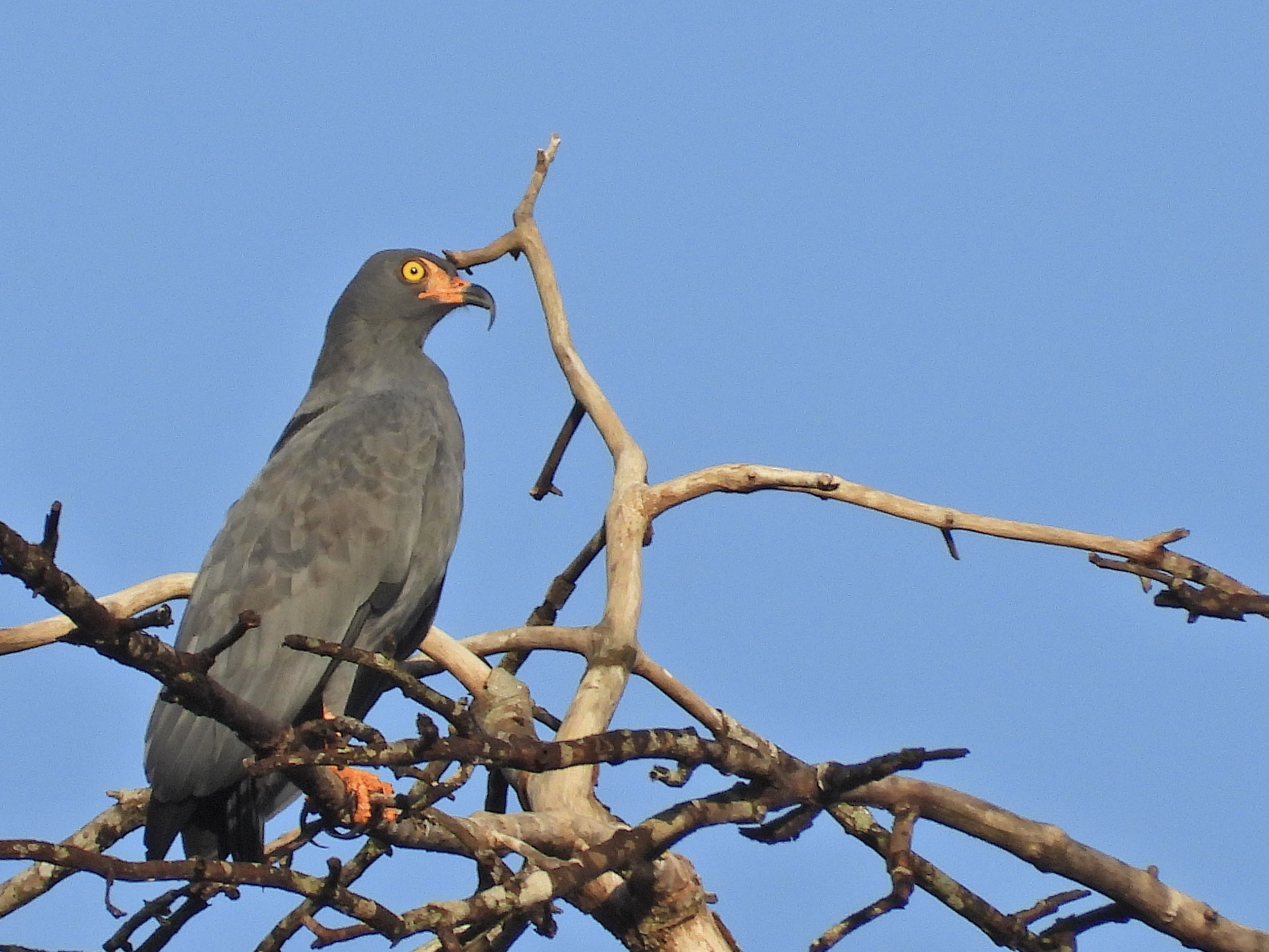

The slender-billed kite is a slaty gray kite with broad, rounded wings and a short, square tail. The species ranges from 36 to 41 centimeters in length and possesses a wingspan of 80–90 centimeters. There is no sexual plumage dimorphism within the species; however, females tend to be larger than the males, weighing between 367 and 485 grams while males weigh between 377 and 448 grams. Their characteristically sharp black beak is hooked, matched by sharp, black talons. Their eyes are yellowish, and their face and legs are orange-red. Juveniles resemble adults, but have brownish eyes and three narrow white bands in the tail.

Both sexes resemble the male snail kite, and the slender-billed kite has often been included in the same genus, Rostrhamus. Adults are distinguished by their yellow, rather than red, eyes and a noticeably shorter tail. Other differences are found in shorter wings and more slender beaks. Nestling slender-billed kites sport a more similar plumage to their adult form than the nestlings of snail kites to theirs.

Their primary call is a nasal kee-ee-aay-aay-aay that begins with a sharp increase in frequency followed by a steady decline. This call is often heard in-flight or in response to predators. Their second call is a repeating ker-ah with oscillating frequency (sometimes followed by repeating ah-ahs) heard as they approach their mate in the nest.

== Diet ==
The characteristic slender bill of the slender-billed kite is an adaptation designed to hunt aquatic snails, mostly of genus Pomacea, in flooded forests and other wetland areas. Though their primary food source is snails, they will hunt for crabs, such as Poppiana dentata. They perch on low branches to search for prey before diving and snatching the snails in their talons. Upon catching their prey, they will hold the snail in their talon and use their hooked beak to remove the operculum and pull the body from the shell. Like the snail kite, slender-billed kites remove the digestive tract from the snail before consuming it, but it is unknown if they similarly remove the albumen. Slender-billed kites tend to hunt for smaller snails than do snail kites.

== Breeding ==
Slender-billed kites nest in trees from 9–20 meters in areas that flood during wet seasons. They commonly nest from June to October, and the nesting period lasts between 98 and 112 days. Typically, two eggs are laid, and the incubation period lasts 30 days. Young can stand at two weeks of age and successfully fly by 40 days. Until 7 weeks of age, the chicks are fed pieces of snail from bill-to-bill by the parent. Males court females by presenting them with snails and feeding them bill-to-bill, leaving and return with more snails until the female accepts the courtship.
