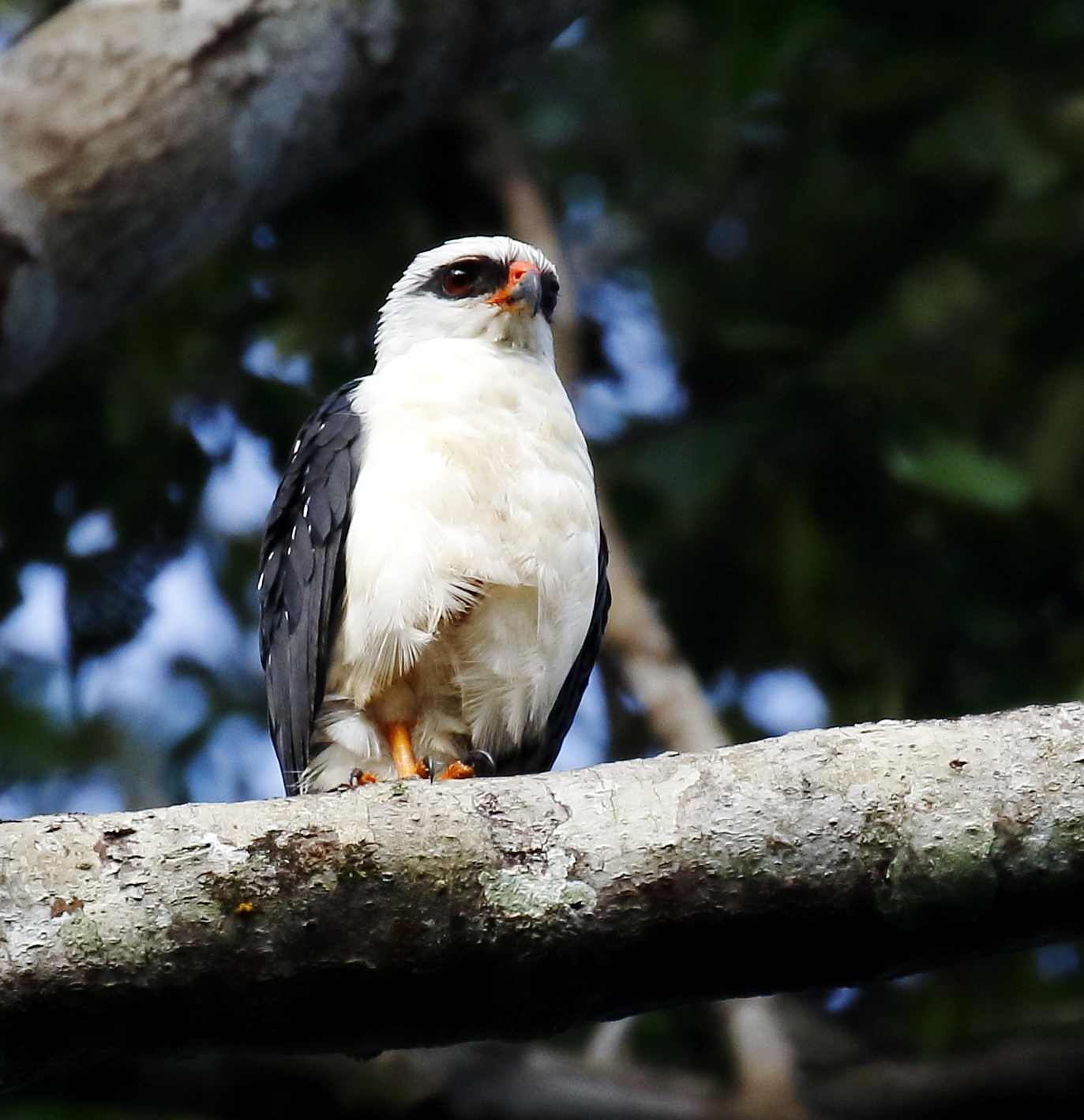
- Black-faced hawk at Presidente Figueiredo, Amazonas state, Brazil

Conservation status
- Least Concern (IUCN 3.1)

Scientific classification
- Kingdom: Animalia
- Phylum: Chordata
- Class: Aves
- Order: Accipitriformes
- Family: Accipitridae
- Genus: Leucopternis
- Species: L. melanops

Binomial name
- Leucopternis melanops (Latham, 1790)

= Black-faced hawk =

Species of bird

The black-faced hawk (Leucopternis melanops) is a species of bird of prey in the family Accipitridae. This low-density species has traditionally been believed to be restricted to Amazon Basin north of the Amazon River, but there are several records south of this river, in, for example, the Brazilian states of Pará and Acre, and southeastern Peru. It is closely related to the white-browed hawk and individuals showing a level of intermediacy between the two species are known, suggesting that they rarely hybridize

== Description ==
The black-faced hawk is a medium-sized hawk with black and white plumage. It has a white underbelly, a large white head streaked with some black and a characteristic black "mask". Below the black mask, it has a dark orange cere and a black tipped bill. The back of the hawk is dark all the way down to the tail with some mottling. However, a single white band sticks out near the base of the tail.

Juvenile plumage resembles adult plumage except that juveniles have thinner streaks of black on the head, two white bands instead of a single one in the tail, and brown at the tips of the feathers.

The black-faced hawk adult looks very similar to the juvenile white-browed hawk. Both hawks have a white head streaked with black, a black face mask and white mottling on the back. The key difference between the sister species is that there are two white bands in the tail of the juvenile white-browed hawk whereas there is only a single band in the adult black-faced hawk. Additionally, at any age, L. melanops has a greater amount of white in the back compared to Leucopternis kuhli.

== Taxonomy ==
The genus Leucopternis currently is considered to contain 10 species of forest-dwelling hawks ranging from Argentina and Uruguay to Southern Mexico. L. kuhli is considered the sister species of L. melanops. Both hawks also happen to be the smallest members of their genus since their total length is < 40 cm. Analysis of mtDNA phylogenetic trees showed that there were three highly supported clades giving a polyphyletic relationship between the species of the genera Leucopternis, Buteogallus and Buteo. Within the Leucopternis lineage, L.melanops and L. kuhli were shown as a sister pair. Gene flow and/or hybridization occurring between both species would explain the similar plumage patterns.

== Habitat and distribution ==
Despite the status of the black-faced hawk as being a rare to uncommon bird, it is widespread north of the Amazon River. Its occurrence south of the Amazon is controversial due to possible confusion with L. kuhli which occurs there. However, the consensus on the range limits for L. melanops is from lowland Peru north of the Amazon and northeastern Ecuador to Venezuela, southern Colombia, Brazil north of the Amazon and the Guyanas.

=== First sightings south of the Amazon ===
In 1931, Amadon (1964) reported the first sighting of one L. melanops near the lower Tapajós River. This observation was the first indication that L. melanops and L. kuhli could co-occur and that the true range of L. melanops included the southern part of the Amazon. However this sighting remains controversial due to the lack of similar sightings following this report and due to the morphological similarities between both species which could lead to a mistaken identification.

=== Habitat ===
The black-faced hawk's preferred habitat is within the tall lowland forest of the Amazon. It may also reside amongst the forest edges, along rivers and mangroves.

== Behaviour ==
The black-faced hawk prefers to remain under forest cover but due to its occurrence near the forest edge, it may perch there and commonly-so in the morning.

=== Flight ===
It has not been seen soaring during flight. Instead, it will glide shortly followed by fast wing beats.

=== Vocalizations ===
The voice call is a piercing, acute and descending whistle: "KEEuuu" or "KEEler" or "KEEyer".

=== Diet ===
Very little information has been recorded on the diet of the black-faced hawk. Although it is assumed that the raptor must have a similar diet to that of the birds in its genus. snakes and other reptiles are the main prey of all Leucopternis species and hence possibly the main diet for the black-faced hawk as well.

=== Reproduction ===
Currently, no direct observations have been reported on the reproductive behaviour of the species. However, it is assumed that this behaviour will resemble that of most species within the genus Leucopternis. Among this genus, raptors make a stick nest in the canopy of a tree and both parents share parental care by incubating the eggs for a period of five weeks.
