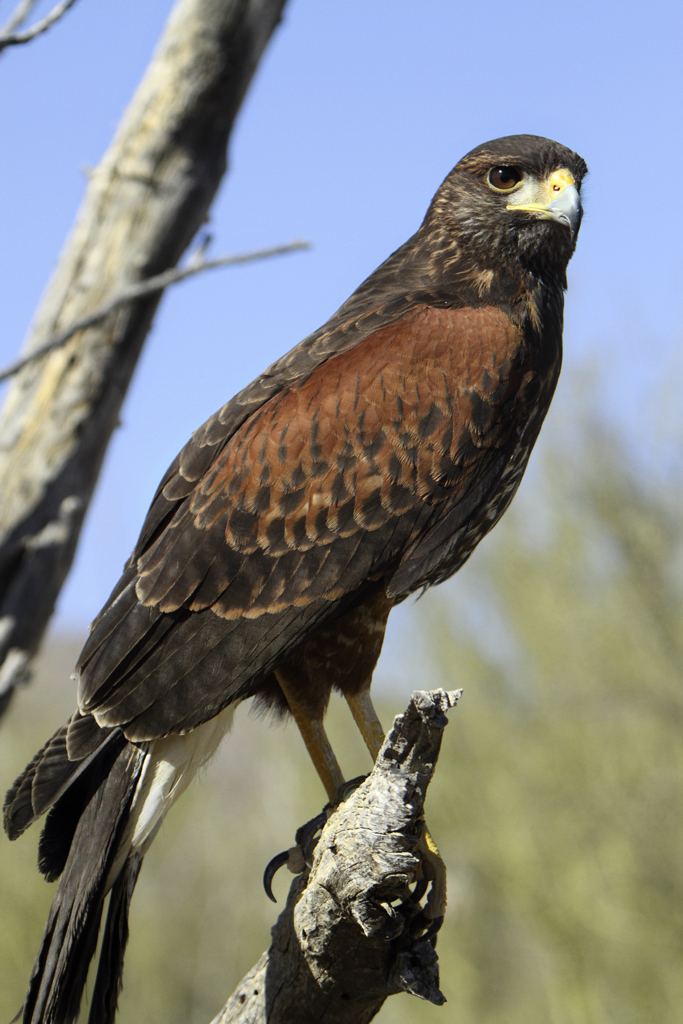
- Harris's hawk (Parabuteo unicinctus)

Scientific classification
- Kingdom: Animalia
- Phylum: Chordata
- Class: Aves
- Order: Accipitriformes
- Family: Accipitridae
- Subfamily: Buteoninae
- Genus: Parabuteo; Ridgway, 1874

Type species
- Buteo harrisi Audubon, 1837

Synonyms
- Antenor Ridgway, 1873 (nec Montfort, 1808) Erythrocnema Sharpe, 1874 Percnohierax Ridgway, 1920

= Parabuteo =

Genus of birds

Parabuteo is a genus of bird of prey in the family Accipitridae. It contains the following species:

Genus Parabuteo – Ridgway, 1874 – two species
Common name	Scientific name and subspecies	Range	Size and ecology	IUCN status and estimated population
Harris's hawk	Parabuteo unicinctus (Temminck, 1824) Two subspecies: P. u. harrisi; P. u. unicinctus	southern US, Mexico, Central & South America	Size: Habitat: Diet:	LC
White-rumped hawk	Parabuteo leucorrhous (Quoy & Gaimard, 1824)	Andes; southern Atlantic forest	Size: Habitat: Diet:	LC
