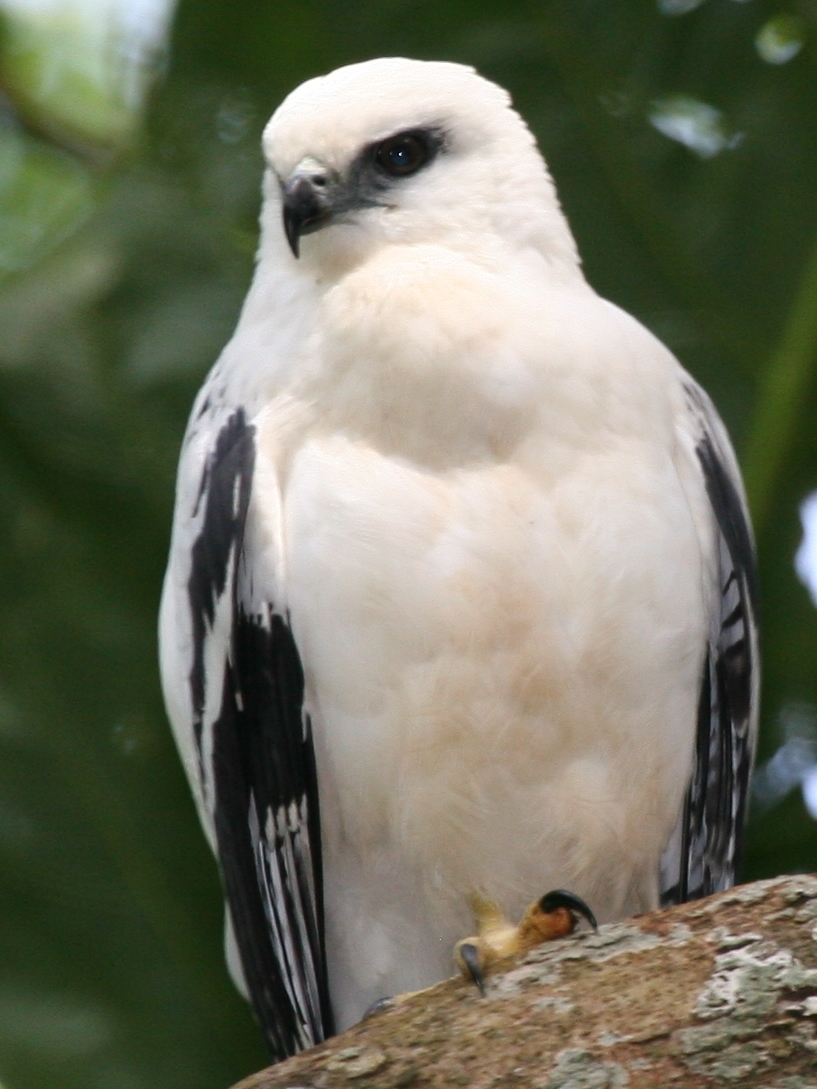
- White hawk (Pseudastur albicollis)

Scientific classification
- Kingdom: Animalia
- Phylum: Chordata
- Class: Aves
- Order: Accipitriformes
- Family: Accipitridae
- Subfamily: Buteoninae
- Genus: Pseudastur; Gray, 1849

= Pseudastur =

Genus of birds

Pseudastur is a genus of bird of prey in the family Accipitridae.

== Systematics ==
The name Pseudastur was coined by Edward Blyth, but was first published in George Robert Gray's Index. The type species is the white hawk, Falco albicollis Latham, 1790.

The species were placed for some time in the genus Leucopternis, however this genus was found to be polyphyletic. In 2012 the American Ornithologists' Union split Leucopternis, placing the white hawk and its relatives under the old name Pseudastur.The genus contains the following species:

Genus Pseudastur – Gray, 1849 – three species
Common name	Scientific name and subspecies	Range	Size and ecology	IUCN status and estimated population
Mantled hawk	Pseudastur polionotus (Kaup, 1847)	Argentina, Brazil, Paraguay, and Uruguay	Size: Habitat: Diet:	NT
White hawk	Pseudastur albicollis (Latham, 1790) Four subspecies: P. a. ghiesbreghti - (Du Bus de Gisignies, 1845); P. a. costaricensis - (Sclater, WL, 1919); P. a. williaminae - (Meyer de Schauensee, 1950); P. a. albicollis - (Latham, 1790)	southern Mexico through Central and South America to Peru, Bolivia and Brazil	Size: Habitat: Diet:	LC
Grey-backed hawk	Pseudastur occidentalis (Salvin, 1876)	Ecuador and far northern Peru	Size: Habitat: Diet:	EN
