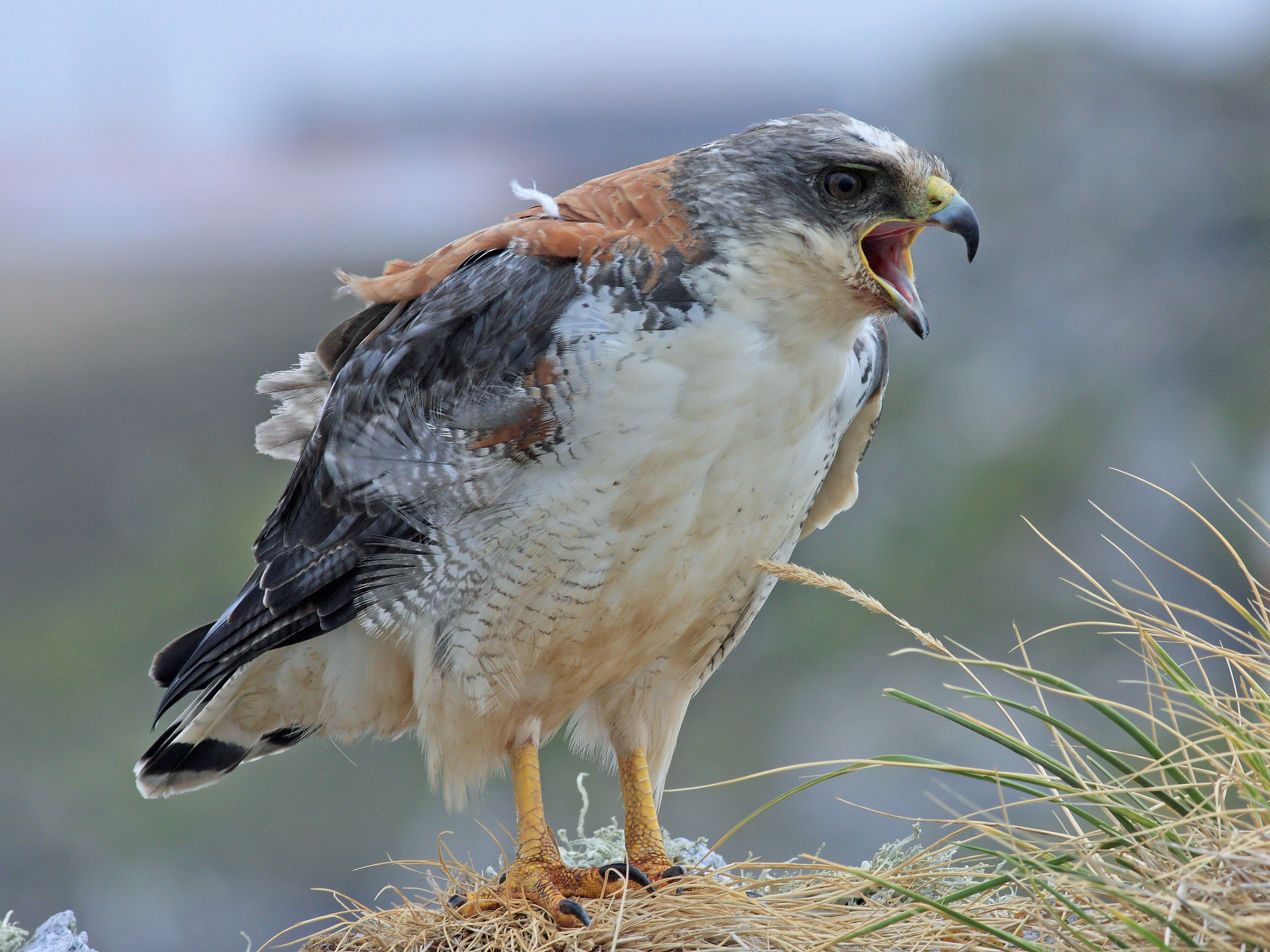
- Female in the Falkland Islands
- Adult in flight while circling

Conservation status
- Least Concern (IUCN 3.1)

Scientific classification
- Kingdom: Animalia
- Phylum: Chordata
- Class: Aves
- Order: Accipitriformes
- Family: Accipitridae
- Genus: Geranoaetus
- Species: G. polyosoma

Binomial name
- Geranoaetus polyosoma (Quoy & Gaimard, 1824)

Subspecies
- G. p. polyosoma - (Quoy & Gaimard, 1824); G. p. exsul - (Salvin, 1875); G. p. poecilochrous - (Gurney Sr, 1879); G. p. fjeldsai - (Cabot, J & de Vries, 2009)

Synonyms
- Buteo poecilochrous Gurney, 1879; Buteo polyosoma

= Variable hawk =

Species of bird

The variable hawk (Geranoaetus polyosoma) is a polymorphic species of bird of prey in the family Accipitridae.

It is widespread and often common in open habitats in western and southern South America, including the Falkland Islands. Its taxonomy is disputed, with some splitting it into the widespread red-backed hawk (G. polyosoma) and the Puna hawk or Gurney's hawk (G. poecilochrous) of the central and northern Andean highlands, but the differences between the two are unclear. Most recent authorities have supported the lumping together of the two hawks although the issue still is controversial. On the contrary, the rare taxon from the Juan Fernández Islands is relatively distinctive, and possibly worthy of species recognition as the Juan Fernández hawk (B. exsul). In this article and most current accounts, the three races are regarded as subspecies.

== Description ==
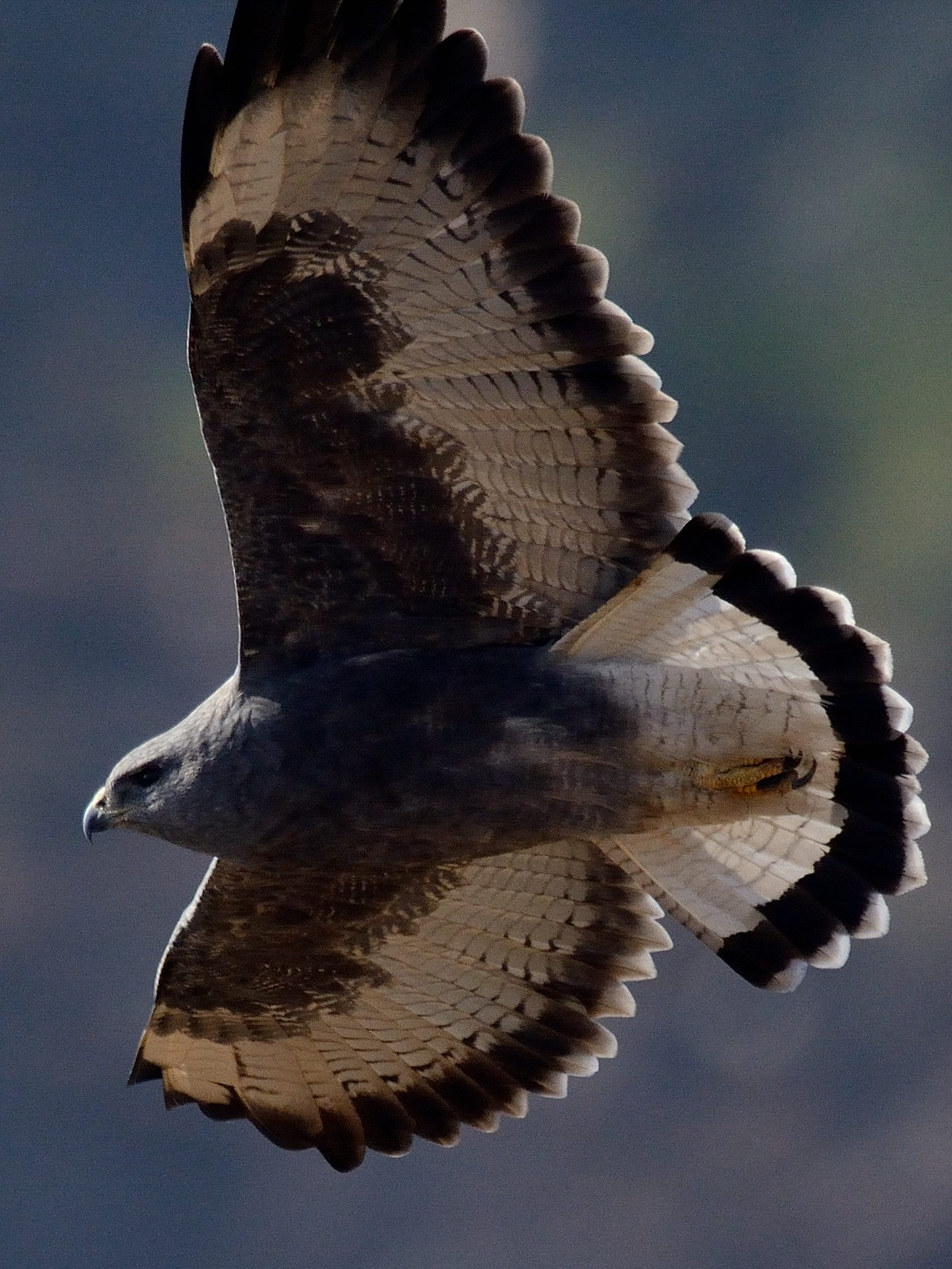
Dark morph individual. Near Santiago

The name variable hawk is fully deserved, as both sexes occur in several morphs. Adults of all have a white tail with a contrasting black subterminal band and grey wings barred dark (in flight from below, the remiges appear whitish with fine barring and a broad black tip). The remaining plumage varies from very dark grey to whitish, and some individuals have reddish-brown to the underparts. Females usually have a reddish-brown back, which males usually lack, although at least some males also have this. The taxon exsul from the Juan Fernández Islands is far less variable, being whitish below and grey above in adults of both sexes. At least 27 distinct adult plumages are known in this species, possibly the most of any raptor (although the widespread red-tailed hawk & Eurasian buzzard have also been noted for a widespread but more uniform spectrum of plumage variations) with no relationship to morphometric variables and only minor geographic variation.

== Size ==
Size is also variable in this confusing species. Lengths can range from 45 to 62 cm (18–25 in) and wingspans from 113 to 151 cm (45–60 in). Weights can range from 800 to at least 1,800 grams (1.8-4 lbs). The Puna hawk subspecies is generally considered to be at the larger end of the size spectrum and the red-backed hawk at the smaller (Juan Hernandez hawk being intermediate), but these distinctions are difficult at best in the field. Overall, however, this species rates as a large Buteo.

== Habitat ==
Variable hawks occupy open habitats at all elevations. The red-backed race inhabits the widest range of areas of the variable hawk races, including above tree line in mountains, Pacific coastal foothills, Patagonian steppes, agricultural areas and edges of river galleries, beech woods and humid premontane and lowland forests. Though often the most likely race to be found in lowlands, even the red-backed is less than common below an elevation of 500 m (up to 3,000 m). The Juan Fernandez race is found on the islands' volcanic slopes and barren grazed grasslands at all elevations. The Puna race are often a common element above tree line in páramo and puna habitat, at higher elevations (5,000+ m) than almost any other raptor. Smaller numbers of the latter race may visit mountain scrub and stunted Polylepis woodland at as low 900 m (but rarely below 2,900 m).

== Behavior ==
They are most often seen soaring on warm thermals but may be seen on almost any type of raised perch (from sign posts to large trees). They prey on almost any small to medium-sized animals that can be caught, but smallish mammals comprise more than 90% of prey in some studies. The most commonly recorded prey includes cavies, tuco-tucos, rabbits, mice and páramo rats. Earthworms, weevils, orthopterans and other invertebrates are often taken. Birds are sometimes taken, including tired petrels around Juan Fernández Islands. Other prey include other rodents & lagomorphs, frogs, lizards, snakes, and fish. The variable hawk hunts with prey being spotted while soaring from the air and pinned on the ground.

Breeding is at various seasons and may be variable for all races. They build large stick nests on any elevated structure available, and sometimes breed cooperatively. One to three eggs are laid. The incubation period is 26 to 36 days. The nestlings fledge anywhere from 40 to 74 days. The larger-bodied, high-elevation hawks take longer to incubate and much longer to fledge than lower elevation hawks.
