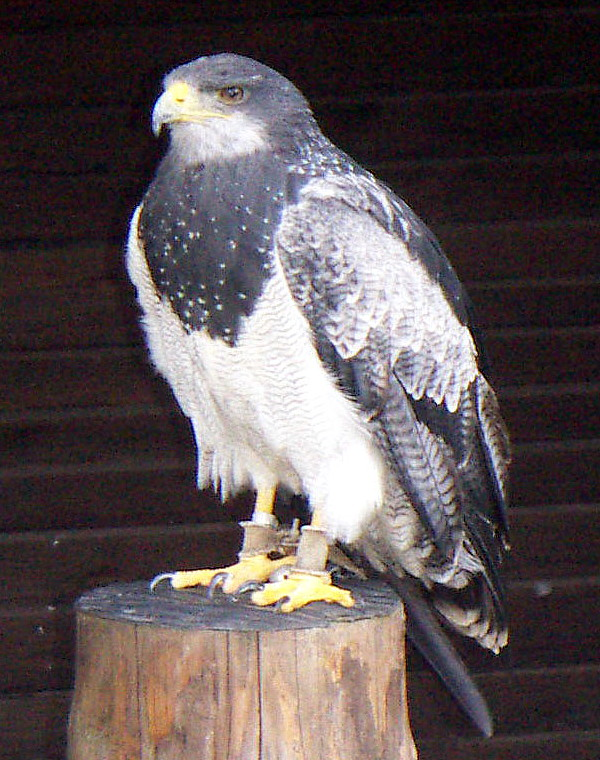
- Black-chested buzzard-eagle (Geranoaetus melanoleucus)

Scientific classification
- Kingdom: Animalia
- Phylum: Chordata
- Class: Aves
- Order: Accipitriformes
- Family: Accipitridae
- Subfamily: Buteoninae
- Genus: Geranoaetus; Kaup, 1844

Type species
- Geranoaetus melanoleucus Temminck,1824

= Geranoaetus =

Genus of birds

Geranoaetus is a genus of birds of prey in the family Accipitridae. It contains three species. Geranoaetus are large birds. Their wing span is about 70–80 inches (180–200 cm) and their total length is 25–30 inches (64–76 cm).

Genus Geranoaetus – Miller, JF, 1778 – three species
Common name	Scientific name and subspecies	Range	Size and ecology	IUCN status and estimated population
White-tailed hawk	Geranoaetus albicaudatus (Vieillot, 1816) Three subspecies: G. a. hypospodius (Gurney Sr, 1876); G. a. colonus (Berlepsch, 1892); G. a. albicaudatus (Vieillot, 1816)	Coastal Texas and the Rio Grande Valley to central Argentina, as well as many Caribbean islands	Size: Habitat: Diet:	LC
Variable hawk	Geranoaetus polyosoma (Quoy & Gaimard, 1824) Four subspecies: G. p. polyosoma (Quoy & Gaimard, 1824); G. p. exsul (Salvin, 1875); G. p. poecilochrous (Gurney Sr, 1879); G. p. fjeldsai (Cabot, J & de Vries, 2009)	Central and north Andean highlands	Size: Habitat: Diet:	LC
Black-chested buzzard-eagle	Geranoaetus melanoleucus (Vieillot, 1819) Two subspecies: Geranoaetus melanoleucus melanoleucus (Vieillot, 1819); Geranoaetus melanoleucus australis Swann, 1922	South America	Size: Habitat: Diet:	LC
