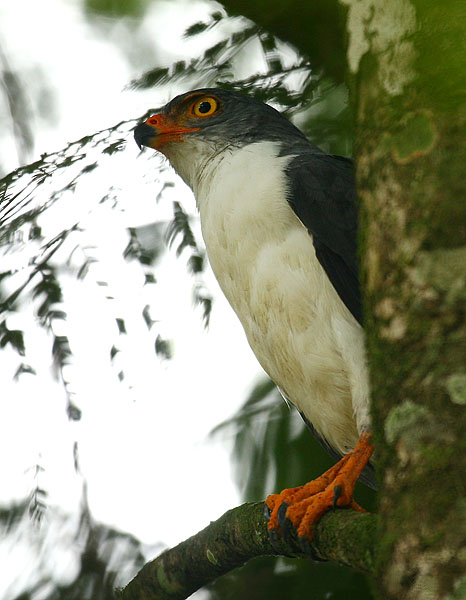
- Semiplumbeous hawk (Leucopternis semiplumbeus)

Scientific classification
- Kingdom: Animalia
- Phylum: Chordata
- Class: Aves
- Order: Accipitriformes
- Family: Accipitridae
- Subfamily: Buteoninae
- Genus: Leucopternis; Kaup, 1847

Type species
- Falco melanops Latham, 1790

= Leucopternis =

Genus of birds

Leucopternis is a Neotropical genus of birds of prey in the family Accipitridae. They are associated with tropical forest, and are uncommon or rare. Their plumage is largely black or gray above and white below, and they have distinctive orange ceres.

== Species ==
Traditionally, Leucopternis contains significantly more species than given here. However, as the genus probably was polyphyletic, moves of species to other genera were proposed and have been accepted by the American Ornithologists' Union's South American Check-list Committee and North American Check-list Committee, except that the South American Committee placed the former L. lacernulatus in the existing genus Buteogallus instead of in a new genus Amadonastur by itself. The other species were placed in the genera Cryptoleucopteryx, Morphnarchus, Pseudastur, and Buteogallus. According to this treatment, the species remaining in Leucopternis are:

Genus Leucopternis – Kaup, 1847 – three species
Common name	Scientific name and subspecies	Range	Size and ecology	IUCN status and estimated population
Semiplumbeous hawk	Leucopternis semiplumbeus Lawrence, 1861	Colombia, Costa Rica, Ecuador, Honduras, and Panama	Size: Habitat: Diet:	LC
Black-faced hawk	Leucopternis melanops (Latham, 1790)	lowland Peru north of the Amazon and northeastern Ecuador to Venezuela, southern Colombia, Brazil north of the Amazon and the Guyanas.	Size: Habitat: Diet:	LC
White-browed hawk	Leucopternis kuhli Bonaparte, 1850	southern Amazon Basin in eastern Peru, Bolivia and northern Brazil	Size: Habitat: Diet:	LC
