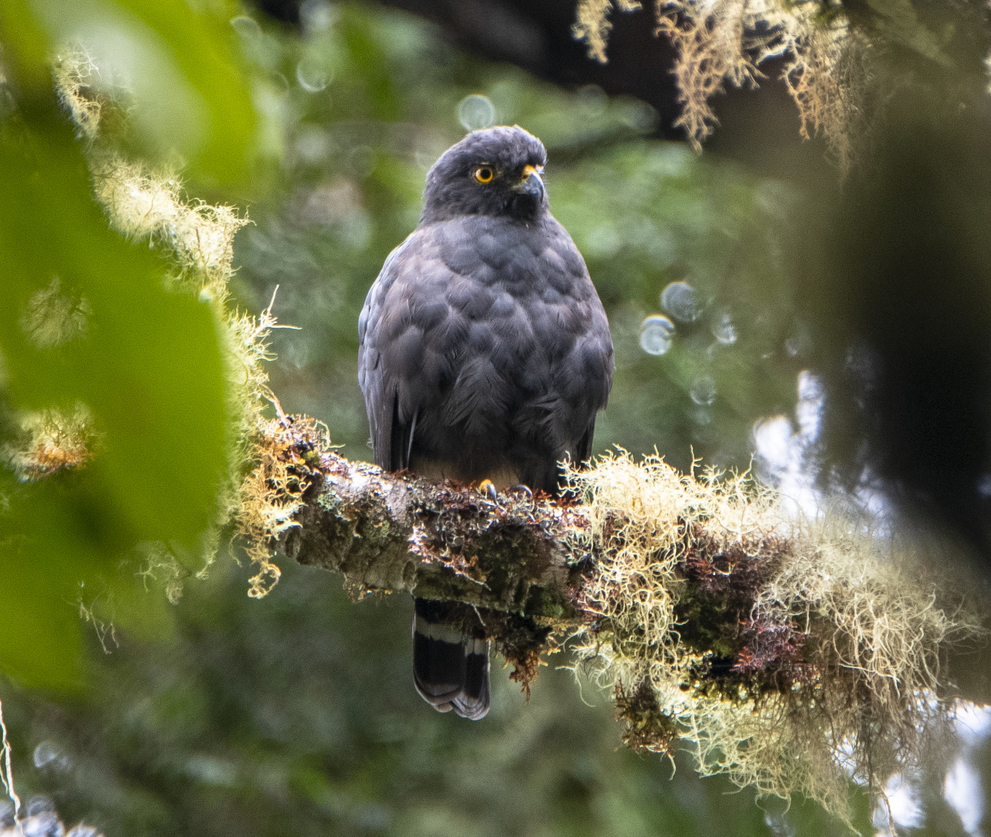

Conservation status
- Least Concern (IUCN 3.1)

Scientific classification
- Kingdom: Animalia
- Phylum: Chordata
- Class: Aves
- Order: Accipitriformes
- Family: Accipitridae
- Genus: Parabuteo
- Species: P. leucorrhous

Binomial name
- Parabuteo leucorrhous (Quoy & Gaimard, 1824)

Synonyms
- Buteo leucorrhous

= White-rumped hawk =

Species of bird

The white-rumped hawk (Parabuteo leucorrhous) is a species of bird of prey in subfamily Accipitrinae, the "true" hawks, of family Accipitridae. It is found in Argentina, Bolivia, Brazil, Colombia, Ecuador, Paraguay, Peru, and Venezuela.

== Taxonomy and systematics ==
The white-rumped hawk was previously placed in the large genus Buteo but a 2009 paper provided the evidence to move it to genus Parabuteo, joining Harris's hawk (P. unicinctus) there. An earlier proposal to place it in the resurrected genus Percnohierax was not accepted. The white-rumped hawk is monotypic.

== Description ==
The white-rumped hawk is 33 to 40 cm (13 to 16 in) long with a 67 to 79 cm (26 to 31 in) wingspan. One male weighed 290 g (10 oz) and one female 389 g (14 oz). Males and females have the same plumage. Adults are almost entirely black but with the namesake white rump and undertail coverts. Their tail has a narrow grayish-brown band at its midpoint and their thighs are feathered rufous. Their eye, cere, legs, and feet are yellow. Immatures have brown upperparts with rufous mottling and heavily mottled rufous underparts.

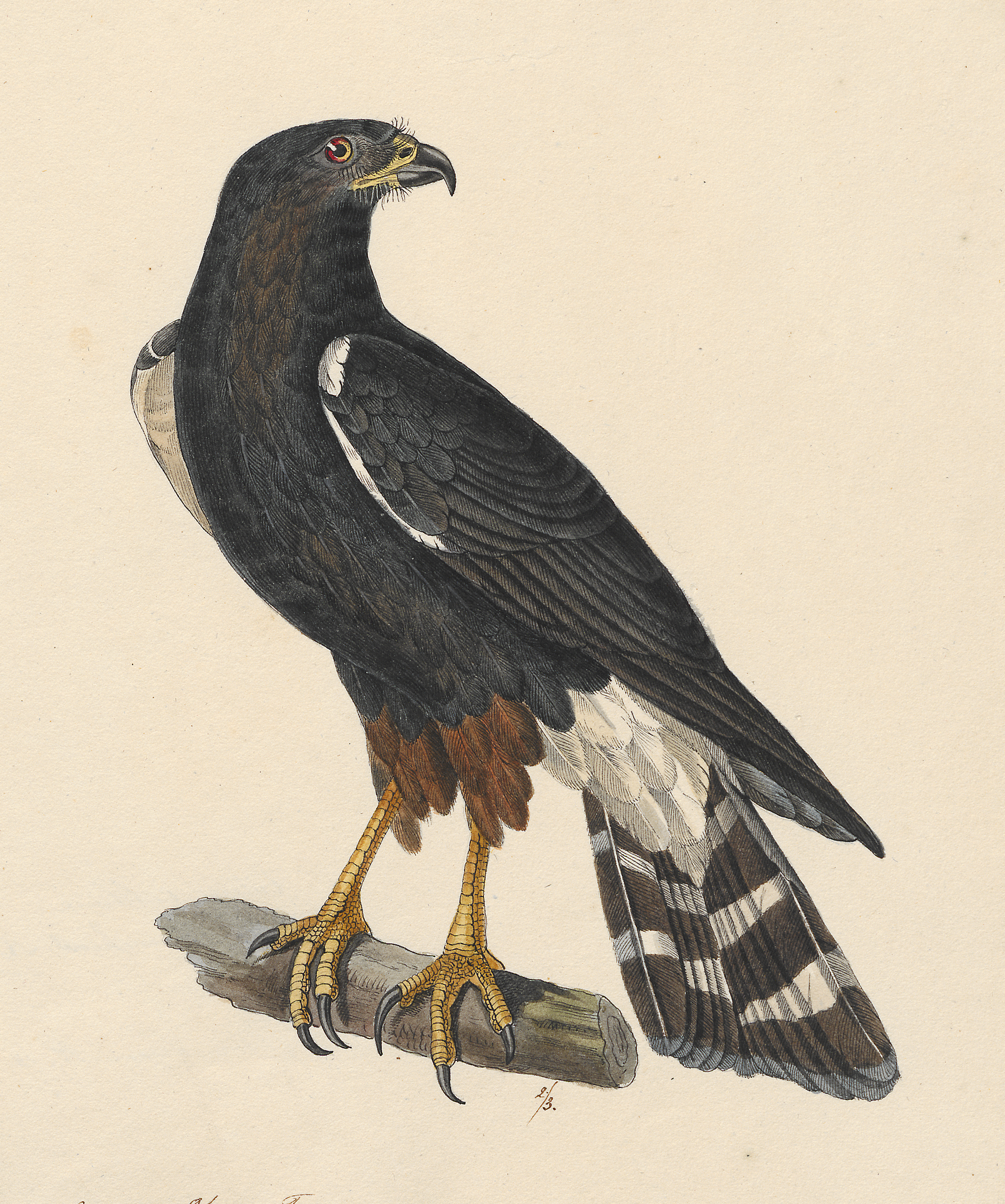
19th century illustration of Astur leucorrhous

== Distribution and habitat ==
The white-rumped hawk has two separate ranges. One is from the Andes and other mountains of Venezuela and Colombia south in the Andes through Ecuador into Peru, Bolivia, and northwestern Argentina. The other range is from southern Brazil through Paraguay into northeastern Argentina. The species inhabits the interior and edges of dense subtropical and tropical forest and also the Chaco in the east. In elevation it mostly occurs between 1,500 and 2,900 m (4,900 and 9,500 ft) in Colombia, between 1,650 and 2,500 m (5,400 and 8,200 ft) in Peru, and up to 3,500 m (11,500 ft) in Bolivia. It occurs at lower elevations in its eastern range.

== Behavior ==
=== Movement ===
The white-rumped hawk is generally sedentary but there is evidence that it is somewhat nomadic.

=== Feeding ===
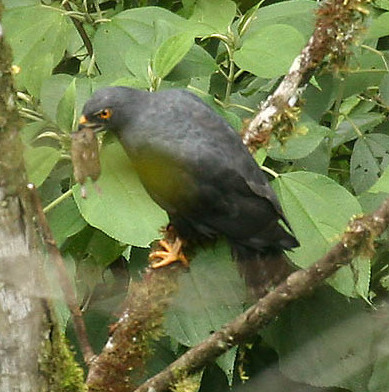
White-rumped Hawk feeding at Tandayapa Bird Lodge, Ecuador.

The white-rumped hawk's hunting methods and diet are mostly unknown. It has been documented feeding on reptiles, frogs, insects, and rats.

=== Breeding ===
The white-rumped hawk's breeding season appears to vary geographically, spanning at least February and March in Colombia and possibly June to January in Ecuador, and including October in Brazil. One described nest was a shallow cup of sticks lined with green leaves placed 22 m (72 ft) above the ground in a pine tree. It contained two eggs.

=== Vocalization ===
The white-rumped hawk's call is "a high-pitched whistle" with some variations such as "KEEEEiu" and "a longer, more monotonous high-pitched whistle".

== Status ==
The IUCN has assessed the white-rumped hawk as being of Least Concern. It has a large range, but its population size is not known and is believed to be decreasing. No immediate threats have been identified. It is "generally rather local and nowhere common, but tolerates somewhat disturbed forest". They are considered common in the western part of their range although, in the eastern part of their range they are locally threatened and populations may be declining.
