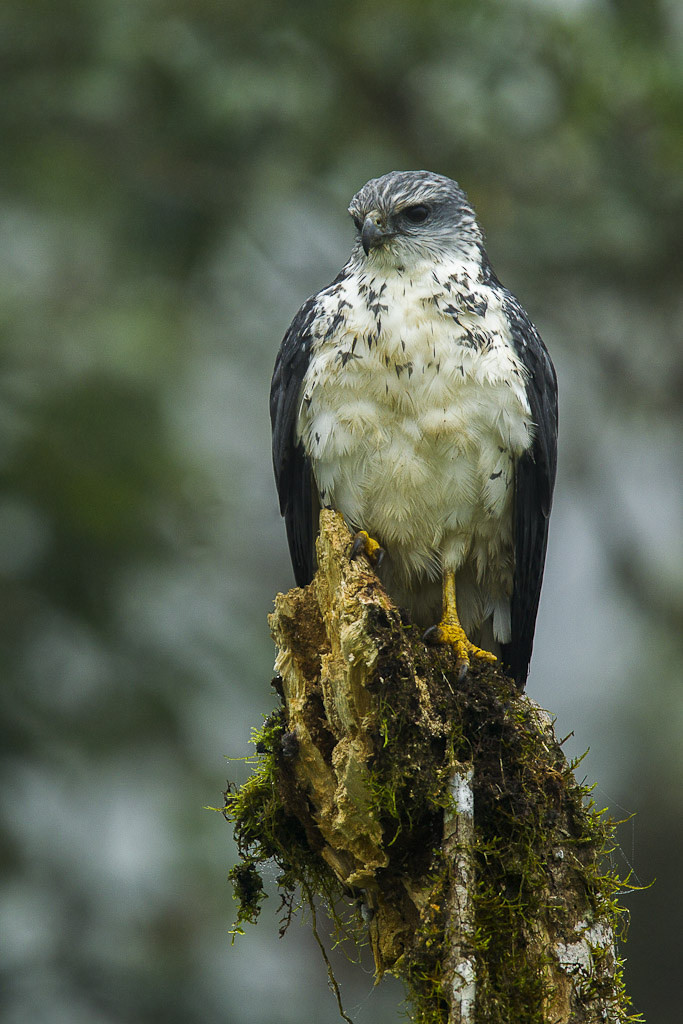

Conservation status
- Vulnerable (IUCN 3.1)

Scientific classification
- Kingdom: Animalia
- Phylum: Chordata
- Class: Aves
- Order: Accipitriformes
- Family: Accipitridae
- Genus: Pseudastur
- Species: P. occidentalis

Binomial name
- Pseudastur occidentalis (Salvin, 1876)

Synonyms
- Leucopternis occidentalis

= Grey-backed hawk =

Species of bird

The grey-backed hawk (Pseudastur occidentalis) is a Vulnerable species of bird of prey in subfamily Accipitrinae, the "true" hawks, of family Accipitridae. It is found in Ecuador and far northern Peru.

== Taxonomy and systematics ==
The grey-backed hawk was traditionally placed in genus Leucopternis but following a 2006 paper, taxonomists moved it and two other species to genus Pseudastur. The grey-backed hawk is monotypic.

== Description ==
The grey-backed hawk is 45 to 52 cm (18 to 20 in) long with a 104 to 116 cm (41 to 46 in) wingspan. One female weighed 660 g (23 oz). Females are about 10% larger than males and both sexes have the same plumage. Adults have a gray and white streaked head, nape, and mantle. They have blackish gray upperparts and a mostly white tail with a wide black band near the end. Their eye is dark brown, their cere gray, and their legs and feet pale yellow. Immatures have brownish gray upperparts, a dusky-striped nape, and gray spots on the breast.

== Distribution and habitat ==
The grey-backed hawk is found locally in western Ecuador between southern Esmeraldas and Loja provinces and slightly into Peru's Department of Tumbes. It inhabits subtropical and tropical semi-deciduous and evergreen forest, cloudforest, and secondary forest. It prefers moist areas and is often found in steep ravines. In elevation it mostly ranges between 100 and 1,400 m (330 and 4,600 ft) but occurs as high as 2,900 m (9,500 ft).

== Behavior ==
=== Movement ===
The grey-backed hawk is sedentary.

=== Feeding ===
The grey-backed hawk's hunting method and diet are not well defined. It has been recorded hunting over streams and croplands and sometimes up to four will hunt together. Its diet includes reptiles, amphibians, crabs, rodents, birds, and large insects.

=== Breeding ===
The grey-backed hawk appears to nest at any time of the year but its breeding activity appears to be concentrated between December and April, the local rainy season. Pairs make display flights. Nothing else is known about its breeding biology.

=== Vocalization ===
During the grey-backed hawk's display flights, one bird will make a "drawn-out screeching keeeaaarr-keeeaaarr... (which rises in central portion) or, alternatively, a high-pitched kéééoooowww".

== Status ==
The IUCN originally assessed the grey-backed hawk as Threatened, and from 1994 – 2024 as Endangered. As of 2024, it has been downlisted to Vulnerable. It has a small range and a best estimate of 2,600 mature individuals in its population, which is believed to be decreasing. The population is fragmented. Its forest habitat is undergoing continuing destruction for timber and agriculture. Even some nominally protected areas are illegally logged and cleared. The "combination of clearance for agriculture and timber supplies and intense grazing (by goats and cattle) in understorey has made [the western] Ecuadorian forests one of [the] world's most threatened ecosystems."
