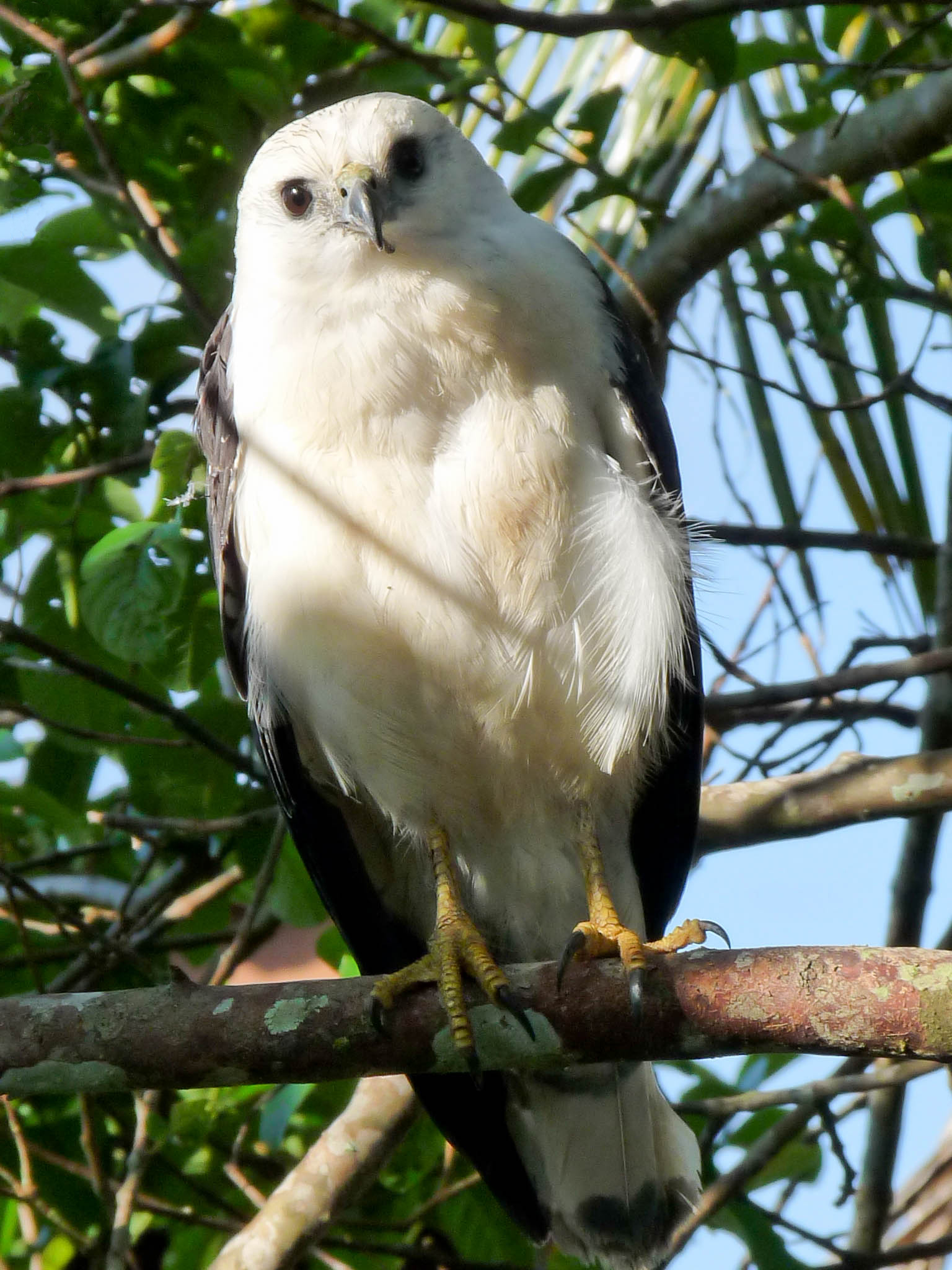
- White-necked hawk at Southeast Brazil

Conservation status
- Near Threatened (IUCN 3.1)

Scientific classification
- Kingdom: Animalia
- Phylum: Chordata
- Class: Aves
- Order: Accipitriformes
- Family: Accipitridae
- Genus: Buteogallus
- Species: B. lacernulatus

Binomial name
- Buteogallus lacernulatus (Temminck, 1827)
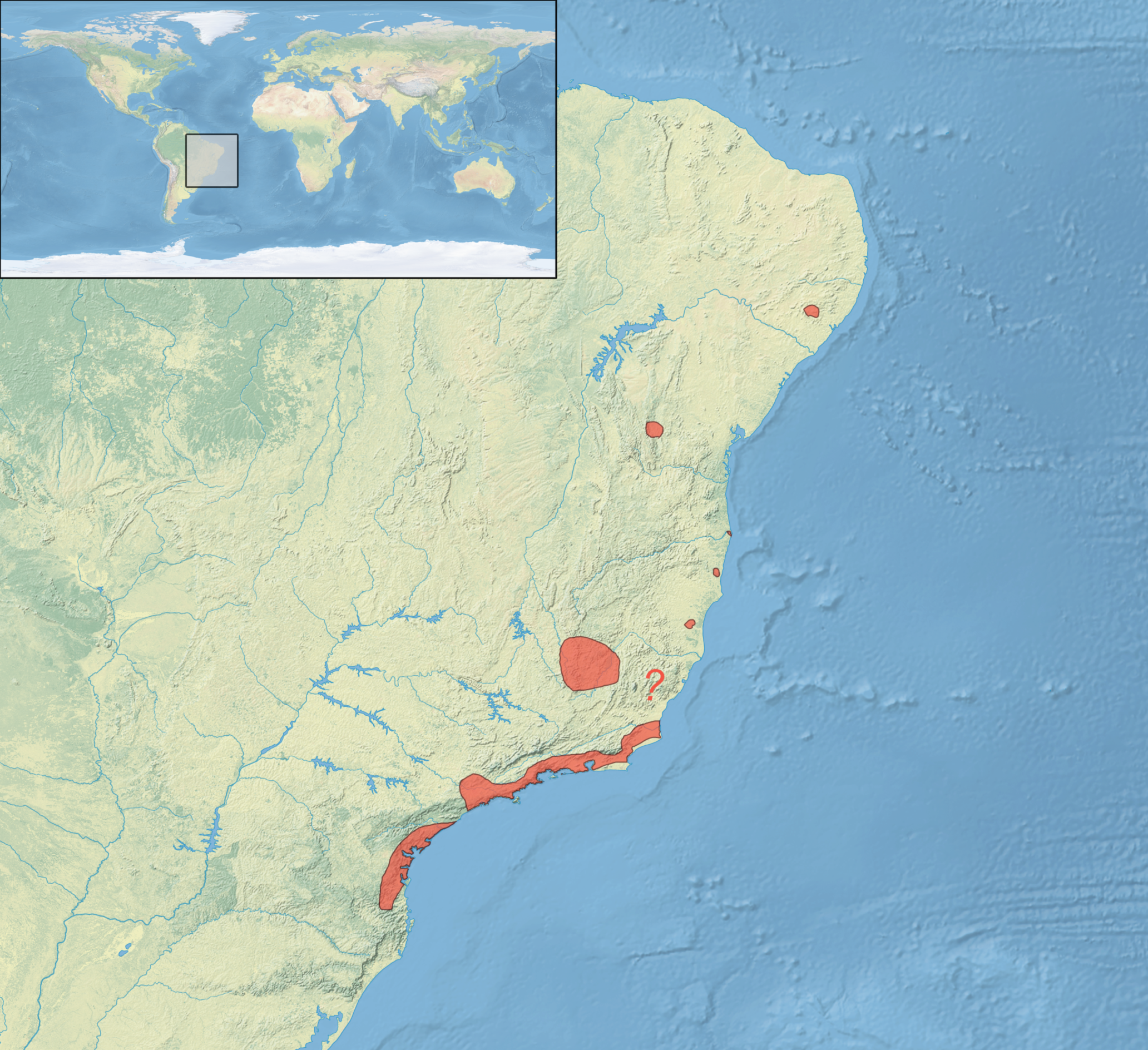

Synonyms
- Leucopternis lacernulata (lapsus); Leucopternis lacernulatus

= White-necked hawk =

Species of bird

The white-necked hawk (Buteogallus lacernulatus) is a Vulnerable species of bird of prey in the subfamily Accipitrinae, the "true" hawks, of family Accipitridae. It is endemic to Brazil.

== Taxonomy and systematics ==
The white-necked hawk was for a time placed in genus Leucopternis but molecular studies placed it in Buteogallus. A 2009 paper proposed the new monotypic genus Amadonastur for it but this treatment has not been accepted by worldwide taxonomic systems. The white-necked hawk is monotypic.

== Description ==
The white-necked hawk is 43 to 48 cm (17 to 19 in) long with a 91 to 101 cm (36 to 40 in) wingspan. Males and females have the same plumage, though females are about 4% larger than males. Adults have a white head and underparts and black upperparts. Their tail is black with a wide white band in the middle. Their eye is brown or pale yellow and their legs and feed yellow. Immatures are similar to adults but with dark streaks on their crown and neck, brown tips on some upperparts feathers, and white barring on the black base of their tail.

== Distribution and habitat ==
The white-necked hawk is found discontinuously in southeastern Brazil from Paraíba south to Paraná state; it might previously have occurred further south in Santa Catarina state. It mostly inhabits dense primary Atlantic Forest but has been recorded in secondary forest. In elevation it generally ranges from sea level to at least 900 m (3,000 ft) and locally to 1,300 m (4,300 ft) in Minas Gerais.

== Behavior ==
=== Movement ===
The white-necked hawk is generally sedentary but there is some evidence of wandering or dispersal from its usual habitat.

=== Feeding ===
The white-necked hawk takes its prey on the ground, dropping from a perch that may be as low as 1.5 m (4.9 ft) high. It is known to follow army ants and monkey troops to prey on what they flush. The data on its diet are inconclusive. Some authors believe that arthropods are its primary prey. Others maintain that it is more of a generalist with a diet of arthropods, reptiles, amphibians, mammals, birds, and snails.

=== Breeding ===
Nothing is known about the white-necked hawk's breeding biology.

=== Vocalization ===
As of late 2022 xeno-canto had only one recording of a white-necked hawk and the Cornell Lab of Ornithology's Macaulay Library had three. Its vocalizations have not been transcribed.

== Status ==
The IUCN originally assessed the White-necked Hawk as Threatened but since 1994 has classed it as Vulnerable. It has a small, fragmented range and its estimated population of between 2,500 and 10,000 mature individuals is believed to be decreasing. Its Atlantic Forest habitat has been much reduced in size and conversion to agriculture continues. It is also persecuted in the mistaken belief that it preys on domestic animals. It does occur in at least 10 protected areas, but they are significant distances from each other with deforested areas between them.

In 2025 the White-necked Hawk was classed as Near Threatened despite a continued decline. Whilst the population estimate of 2,500 to 10,000 still remains the current rate of decline (15% over three generations) does not justify a listing of Vulnerable.
