= Black Hawk =

Black Hawk and Blackhawk may refer to:

== Animals ==
- Common black hawk, Buteogallus anthracinus
- Cuban black hawk, Buteogallus gundlachii
- Great black hawk, Buteogallus urubitinga
- Mangrove black hawk, Buteogallus (anthracinus) subtilis
- Black Hawk (horse), a Morgan horse that lived from 1833 to 1856
- Black Hawk (racehorse), a Thoroughbred racehorse who won the 1999 Sprinters Stakes and the 2001 Yasuda Kinen

== Indigenous people ==
- Black Hawk (Sauk leader) (1767–1838), Sauk and Fox leader
- Black Hawk (artist) (c. 1832–c. 1890), Sans Arc Lakota artist
- Black Hawk (lacrosse) (1877–?), Native American lacrosse player
- Antonga Black Hawk (c. 1830–1870), Ute leader

== Military ==
- Sikorsky UH-60 Black Hawk, a US Army utility helicopter
- 86th Infantry Division (United States) or Black Hawk Division
- Curtiss-Wright XF-87 Blackhawk, a prototype jet fighter
- HM-15 "Blackhawks", a U.S. Navy helicopter squadron
- Sikorsky S-67 Blackhawk, a prototype attack helicopter
- USS Black Hawk (1848), a tinclad gunboat
- USS Black Hawk (AD-9), a Black Hawk-class destroyer tender 1913 to 1947
- USS Black Hawk (MHC-58), an Osprey-class coastal minehunter

== Arts, entertainment, and media ==
=== Comics ===
- Blackhawk (DC Comics), an aviator comic book hero and leader of a team named Blackhawks
  - Blackhawk (radio), a 1950 ABC radio series based on the comic book
  - Blackhawk (serial), a 1952 Columbia serial based on the comic book
- Blackhawk (Tornado), a Tornado/2000 AD comic book character
- Blackhawks (DC Comics), a 2011 comic book series

=== Other uses in arts, entertainment, and media ===
- Black Hawk Statue, a 1911 statue by Lorado Taft
- Blackhawk (band), American country music band
  - Blackhawk (album), their self-titled debut album
- Blackhawk, a fictional type of spaceship in Peter F. Hamilton's The Night's Dawn Trilogy novels
- Blackthorne or Blackhawk, a 1994 video game

== Brands and enterprises ==
- Blackhawk (tools), a brand of the Stanley Works
- Blackhawk Films, a film distributor
- Blackhawk Network Holdings, an American corporation

== Hospitality ==
- Black Hawk (nightclub), a jazz venue in San Francisco
- Black Hawk Hotel, a hotel in Cedar Falls, Iowa
- Blackhawk (restaurant), a restaurant and supper club first in Chicago and then in Wheeling
- Hotel Blackhawk, a hotel Davenport, Iowa

== Places ==
- Black Hawk, Colorado, a home rule municipality
- Black Hawk, Kentucky, an unincorporated community
- Black Hawk, Louisiana, an unincorporated community
- Black Hawk, Mississippi, an unincorporated community
- Black Hawk Bridge, a bridge over the Mississippi River between Iowa and Wisconsin
- Black Hawk County, Iowa
- Black Hawk Lake (Sac County, Iowa), a glacial lake
- Black Hawk Purchase, an historical region of Iowa
- Blackhawk, California, an unincorporated community and census-designated place
- Blackhawk, Illinois, an unincorporated community
- Blackhawk, Indiana, an unincorporated town
- Blackhawk, Ohio, an unincorporated community
- Blackhawk, South Dakota, an unincorporated census-designated place
- Blackhawk, West Virginia, an unincorporated community
- Black Hawk, Wisconsin, an unincorporated community
- Blackhawk Park, Vernon County, Wisconsin

== Sports ==
- Atlanta Blackhawks, a former American soccer team
- Chicago Blackhawks, an American team in the National Hockey League
- Iowa Blackhawks, an American indoor football team now known as the Lincoln Haymakers
- Plattling Black Hawks, an American football club from Plattling, Germany
- San Francisco Bay Blackhawks, a former American soccer team
- Townsville Blackhawks, a semi-professional rugby league team based in Townsville, Australia
- Tri-Cities Blackhawks, an American team now known as the Atlanta Hawks
- Waterloo Black Hawks, an American junior hockey team

== Transportation ==
- Black Hawk (Amtrak train), a passenger train between Chicago and Dubuque, Iowa
- Black Hawk (CB&Q train), a former passenger train between Chicago, Illinois, and Minneapolis/St. Paul, Minnesota
- Black Hawk (steamboat), a steamboat built around 1850 and operated in California and Oregon
- Blackhawk (automobile), an automobile manufactured in 1929 and 1930 by the Stutz Motor Car Company in Indianapolis
- Blackhawk, a Carr Special racing aircraft of the 1930s
- Butler Blackhawk 1920s US three-seat utility biplane
- Buick Blackhawk, a retro concept 2+2 convertible built by Buick in 2001
- Stutz Blackhawk, a car manufactured from 1971 through 1987 named for the earlier Stutz car
- USS Black Hawk, the name of several United States military vessels

== Other uses ==
- Black Hawk College, Moline, Illinois
- Ruger Blackhawk, a single-action revolver

== See also ==
- 1994 Black Hawk shootdown incident, a friendly fire incident over northern Iraq (different from Black Hawk Down)
- Black Hawk Down (disambiguation)
- Black Hawk War (1832)
- Black Hawk War (1865–1872)
