= Winneshiek =

Winneshiek may refer to the following:

== Places ==
United States

- Winneshiek, Illinois, an unincorporated community
- Winneshiek County, Iowa
- Lake Winneshiek, reservoir

== Other ==
- Winneshiek Players, an American community theater group
