= USS Black Hawk =

USS Black Hawk may refer to the following ships of the United States Navy:

- USS Black Hawk (1848), an ironclad gunboat built as New Uncle Sam. Sold to US Navy in 1862; commissioned as USS Uncle Sam; then renamed USS Black Hawk.
- USS Black Hawk (1904), originally the HAPAG ocean liner Rhaetia. Seized by US in 1917 and renamed Black Hawk.
- USS Black Hawk (AD-9), Black Hawk-class destroyer tender 1913 to 1947.
- USS Black Hawk (MHC-58), an Osprey-class minehunter coastal.
