= Shoalwater (1852 sidewheeler) =

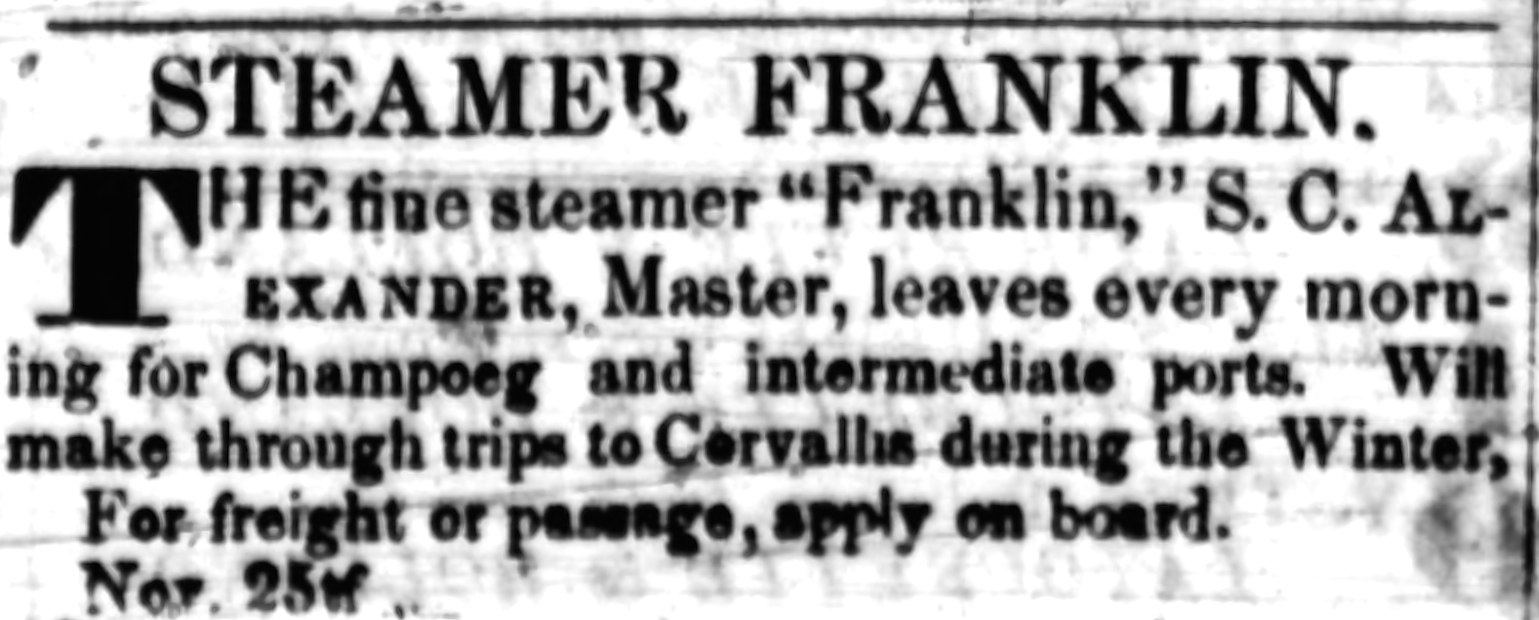
- Advertisement for steamer Franklin (a later name of Shoalwater), published February 17, 1855.
- Name: Shoalwater (sidewheel steamboat)
- Owner: McCarver & White and others later
- Route: Willamette River
- Fate: Dismantled 1858
- Type: inland steamship (passenger/freight)
- Length: 93 ft (28.3 m)
- Beam: 17.5 ft (5.3 m)
- Depth: 3.0 ft (0.9 m) depth of hold
- Installed power: twin steam engines, horizontally mounted, 12 in (30 cm) bore x 48 in (120 cm) stroke 9.6 net horsepower.
- Propulsion: sidewheels
- Notes: later renamed Fenix, Franklin and Minnie Holmes. Dismantled 1858, at Salem, Oregon

The steamboat Shoalwater was the sixth steamer to operate on the upper Willamette River, which refers to the part of the river above Willamette Falls at Oregon City. In a short career of six years, Shoalwater was renamed Fenix, Franklin, and Minnie Holmes. Shoalwater was the first steamboat in Oregon to suffer a boiler explosion, although no fatalities resulted.

== Construction ==
Shoalwater was built in 1852 by Leonard White at Canemah, a small settlement just above Willamette Falls. Her first owners were McCarver and Son, who were merchants in Oregon City. Leonard White and others may have had ownership interests in the vessel. Shoalwater was fitted with two geared engines, of which historian Corning said "generated more noise than power". Shoalwater, as her name indicated, was designed to run when all other boats were compelled to lay up for lack of water on the sand and gravel bars that often blocked river navigation.

== Mechanical failure and renaming as Fenix ==
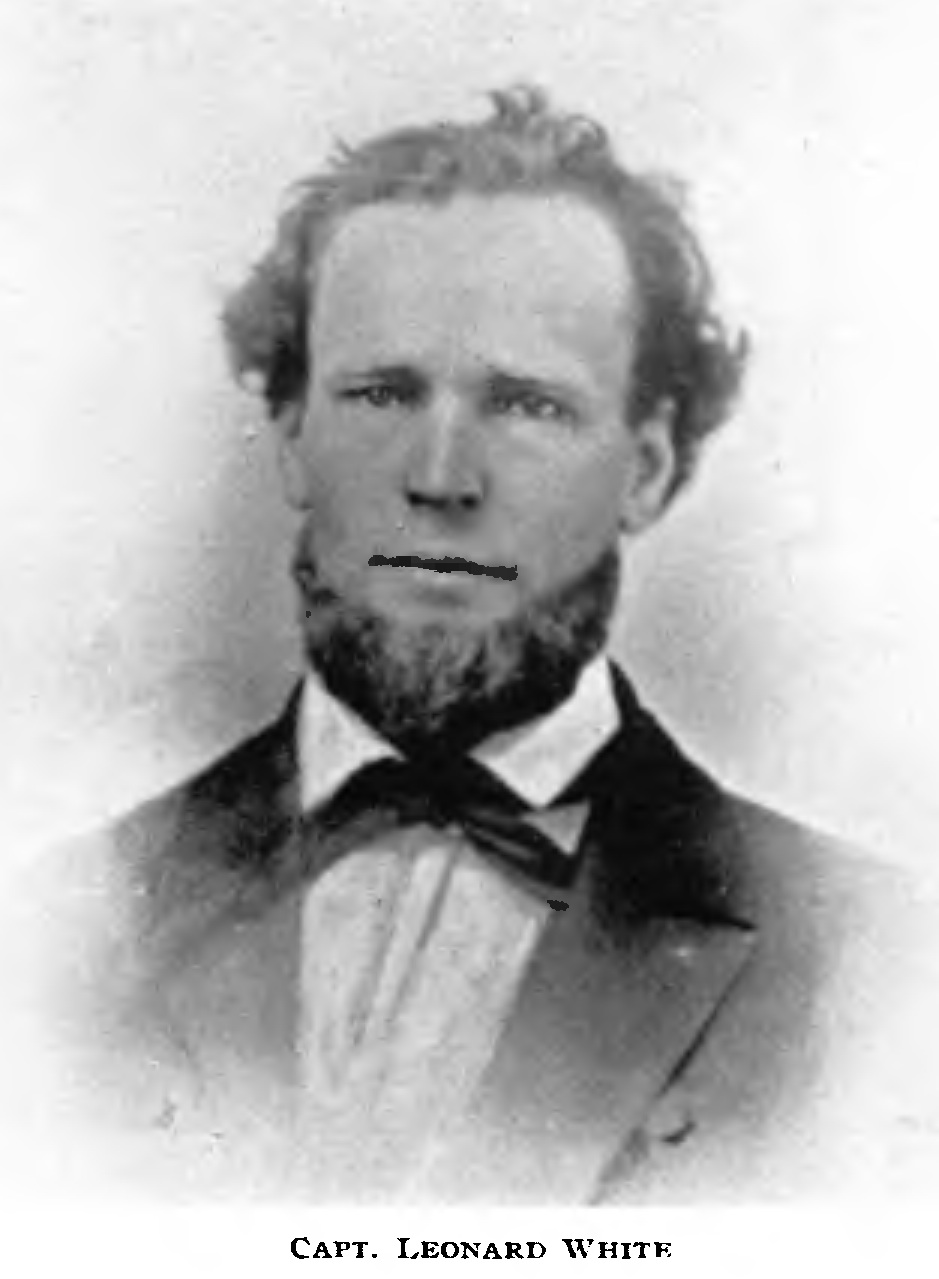
Leonard White (d.1870).

On April 30, 1853, while Shoalwater was making a landing below Rock Island near Butteville on the Willamette River between Champoeg and Canemah, the steam ran up too fast, causing a flue to collapse. Several persons received injuries, none of which, however, resulted seriously. The accident proved so expensive that the vessel changed ownership and name, this time to Fenix (the owners' method of spelling Phoenix).

== Reaching the head of navigation ==
Fenix became part of the short-lived Defiance Line, which made daily runs south from Canemah with the steamers Wallamet and Canemah. During this time, Capt. Leonard White, who was considered one of the most intrepid of all steamboat captains of the time, took Fenix up the Willamette River to Harrisburg, which was further upriver then any steamboat had yet been run, and well above Corvallis, which was the presumed head of navigation at the time. Fenix is also recorded as having taken Independence Day celebrants out from Champoeg for a three-mile (5 km) excursion cruise on July 4, 1854.

== Operations on Yamhill River ==
Captain White sold Fenix to Captain Hereford, who with others in the Willamette Falls Company was trying to organize a steamboat line. Hereford put Fenix on the run from Canemah up the Willamette and then the Yamhill River to Lafayette. Hereford was competing with the larger steamer Oregon and once tried to pass Oregon on a narrow stretch of the river. The vessels collided, and Oregon shoved Fenix out of the way. The Willamette Falls Company decided to sell Fenix and replace her with a steamer then under construction at Canemah. (That steamer was never launched, having burned on the ways when almost complete.)

== Sale to Citizens' Accommodation Line ==
Fenix was sold and again renamed, as Franklin and was run by the Citizens' Accommodation Line in company with Canemah. Three times a week Franklin made trips from Canemah to Salem, stopping at the many landings along the way. In February 1855, Franklin was advertised as making daily trips to Champoeg, Oregon and intermediate points, and would make through trips to Corvallis during the winter. Franklin was then running under the command of S.C. Alexander.

Franklin was later lengthened and renamed Minnie Holmes, in honor of a young woman of Oregon City. In May 1857, Minnie Holmes was running under the command of Capt. Leonard White, who had a reputation as a popular man which could help the boat financially.

(Minnie Holmes later married Dan O' Neill, who in 1850 had been a captain of Columbia, the first steamboat built in the Oregon Territory. O'Neill later became a long-term steamboat purser.)

== Conversion to sawmill ==
Shoalwater was unable to earn money under any name, and so in 1858 sold her to B. N. Du Rell, by whom she was taken to Salem and fitted up as a floating sawmill. The machinery was subsequently removed and permanently located on the bank of the river, where it was used in the manufacture of lumber until 1860, at which time the mill was destroyed by fire.
