= Wexford Creek =

Coordinates: 43.2505346°N 91.0979066°W

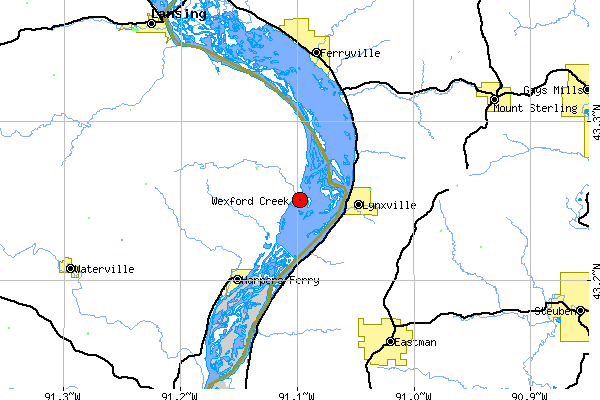
Wexford Creek (the red dot indicates its confluence with the Mississippi) (USGS)

Wexford Creek is a very minor tributary of the Upper Mississippi River, confined entirely to Lafayette Township in Allamakee County, Iowa. Its drainage area measures 11.9 square miles (31 km^{2}). It enters the river into Lake Winneshiek (Navigation Pool 9) opposite Lynxville, Wisconsin. The area is entirely rural, with some cleared farmland, but is mostly forested.

== See also ==
- List of rivers of Iowa

== Sources ==
- U.S. Geological Survey Geographic Names Information System: Wexford Creek
- US Geological Survey (*.pdf)
- Iowa Department of Natural Resources
- cLocation, with map
