= Black Hawk Down =

Black Hawk Down may refer to:

== Military ==
- Battle of Mogadishu (1993), a battle between forces of the United States and Somali militia fighters
- 1994 Black Hawk shootdown incident, a friendly fire incident over northern Iraq

== Arts, entertainment, and media ==
- Black Hawk Down (book), a 1999 book by Mark Bowden about the 1993 Battle of Mogadishu
  - Black Hawk Down (film), a 2001 film adaptation of Bowden's book, directed by Ridley Scott
    - Black Hawk Down (soundtrack), the soundtrack to the 2001 film of the same name
- "Blackhawk Down", a song from the 2000 album Rancid by the American punk rock band Rancid
- Delta Force: Black Hawk Down, a 2003 action game based on the events in Somalia
  - Delta Force: Black Hawk Down – Team Sabre, a 2004 expansion pack for PC and 2006 standalone release for PS2
  - Black Hawk Down, a campaign DLC for the 2025 videogame Delta Force that's based on the 2001 film of the same name

== See also ==
- Sikorsky UH-60 Black Hawk, the military helicopter used by the United States in the 1993 Battle of Mogadishu
- Black Hawk (disambiguation)
