= Lock and Dam No. 9 =

Dam in Iowa and Wisconsin, U.S.

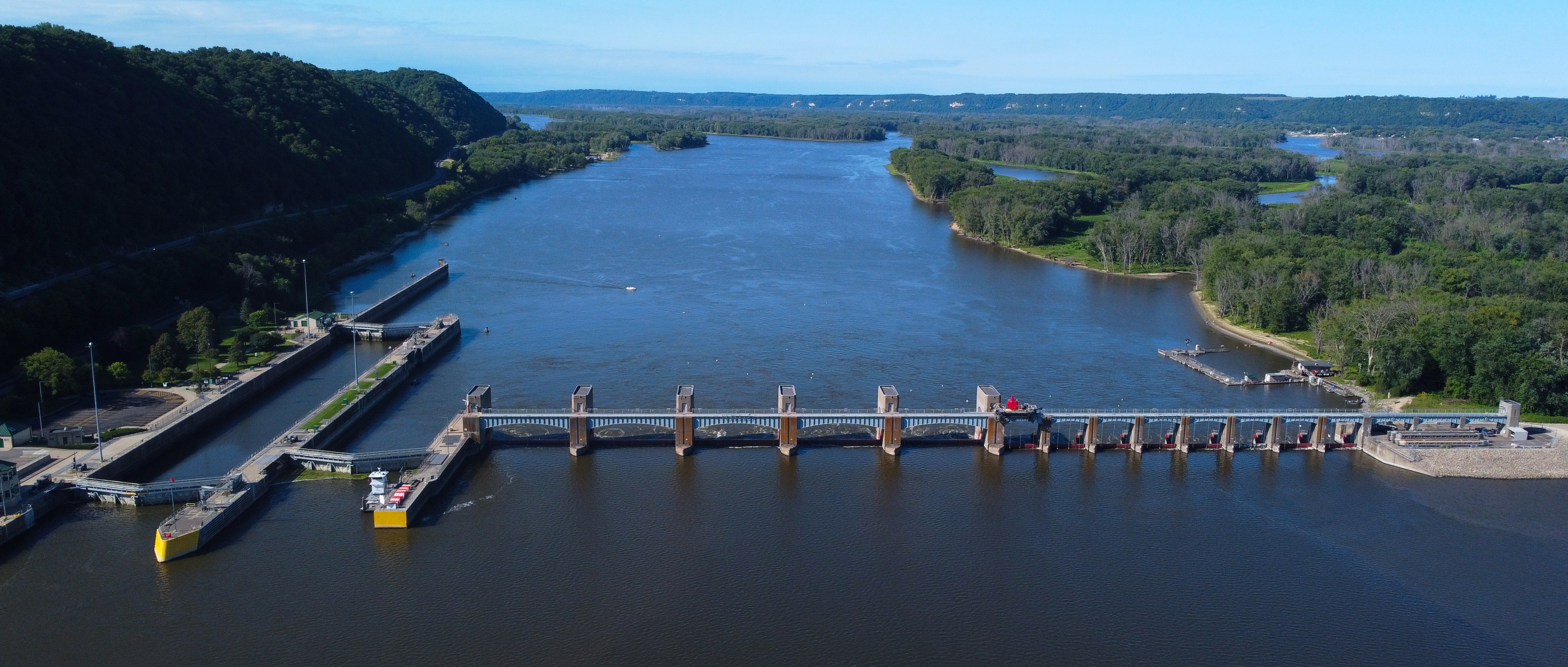
- Mississippi River Lock and Dam No. 9

- Location within Wisconsin
- Location: Taylor Township, Allamakee County, Iowa / Seneca, Crawford County, Wisconsin, near Lynxville, Wisconsin, USA
- Coordinates: 43°12′46″N 91°06′15″W
- Construction began: 1936; 90 years ago
- Opening date: July 1937; 89 years ago
- Operators: U.S. Army Corps of Engineers, St. Paul District

Dam and spillways
- Impounds: Upper Mississippi River

Reservoir
- Creates: Pool 9 / Lake Winneshiek
- Total capacity: 470,000 acre⋅ft (0.58 km^{3})
- Catchment area: 66,610 mi^{2} (172,500 km^{2})

Lock and Dam No. 9 is an American lock and dam located near Lynxville, Wisconsin and Harpers Ferry, Iowa on the Upper Mississippi River around river mile 647.9. The lower portion of Pool 9 was formally named Lake Winneshiek. The normal pool elevation behind the dam is 620 feet (189.0 m). It was constructed and placed in operation in July 1937. The site underwent a major rehabilitation from 1989 and 2006. The dam consists of concrete structure 811 feet (247.2 m) long with five roller gates and eight tainter gates. Earth embankment 9,800 feet (2,987.0 m) long with a grouted overflow spillway 1,350 feet (411.5 m) long. The lock is 110 feet (33.5 m) wide by 600 feet (182.9 m) long. Lock and Dam No. 9 is located 12 miles upstream from Prairie du Chien, Wisconsin. The lock and dam are owned and operated by the St. Paul District of the United States Army Corps of Engineers-Mississippi Valley Division.

== Images ==
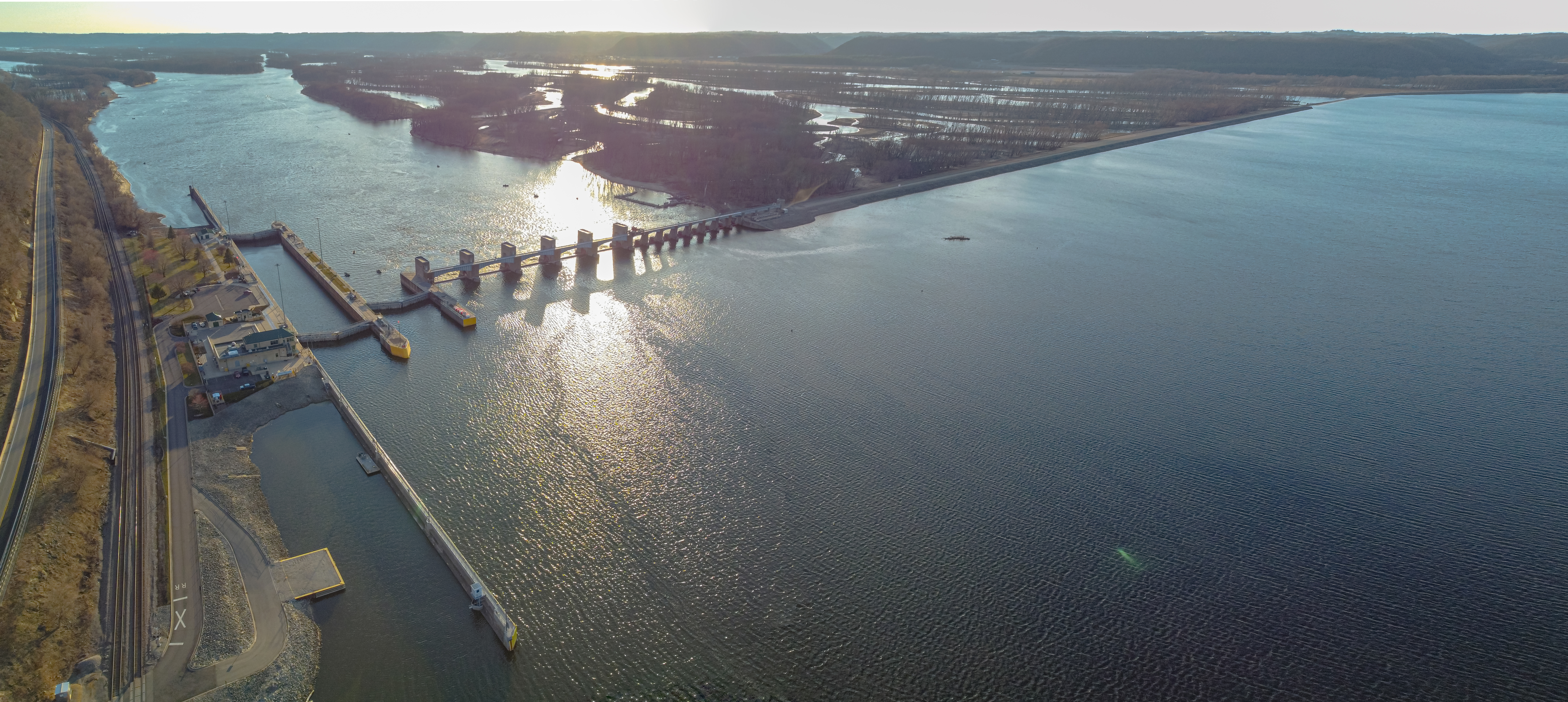
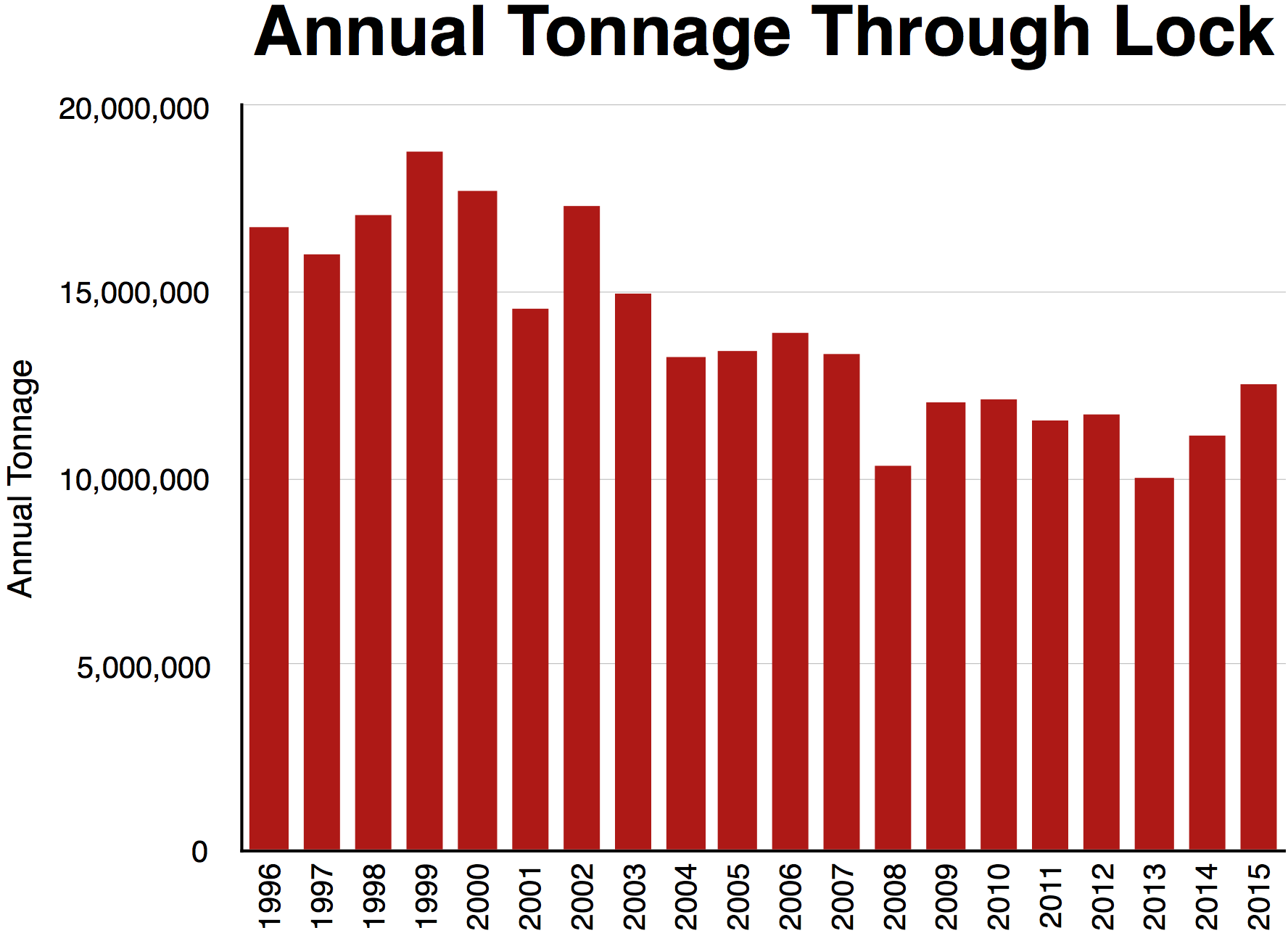

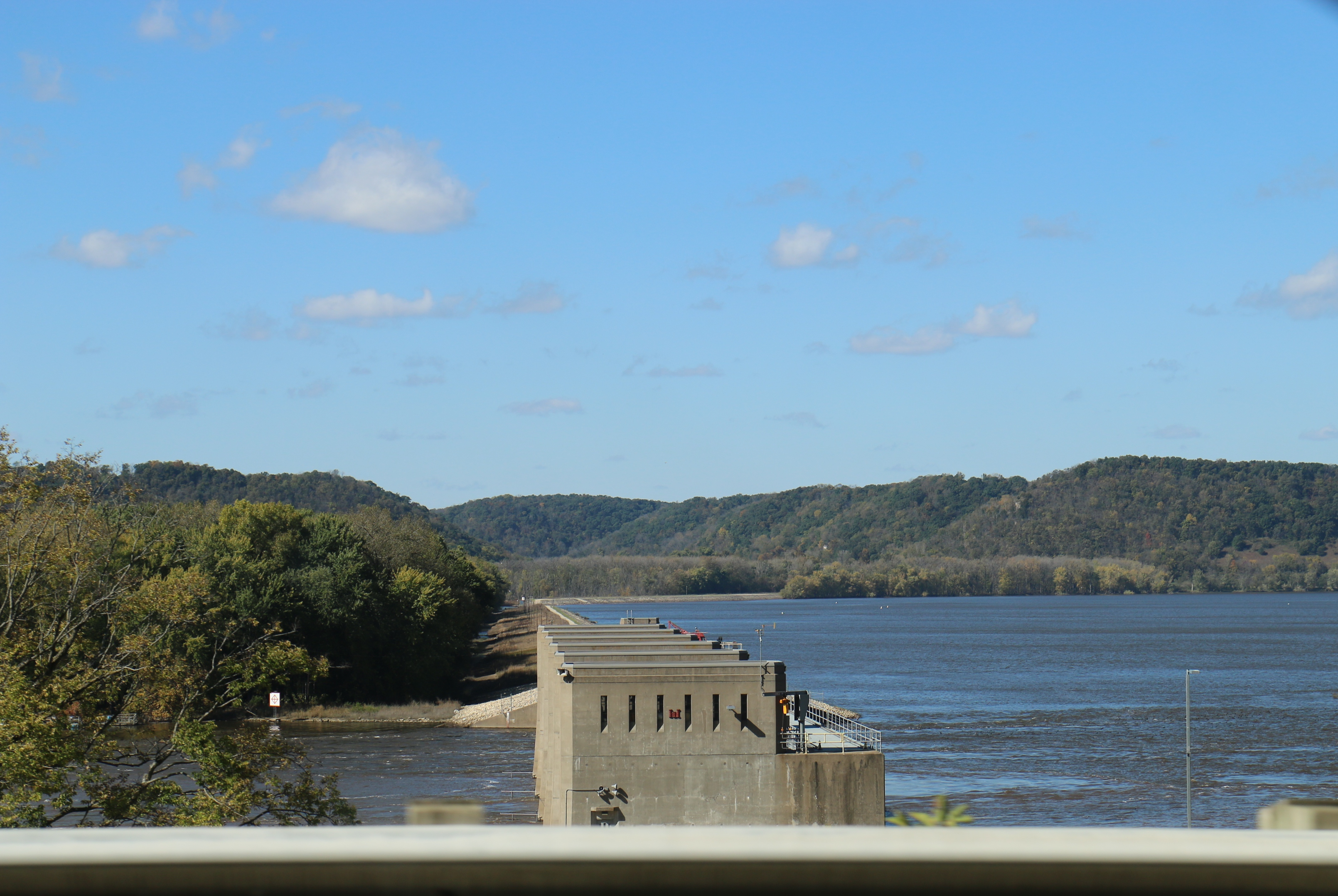
Ground view from WIS35

== See also ==
- Blackhawk Park
- Public Works Administration dams list
- Upper Mississippi River National Wildlife and Fish Refuge
