= Wallamet (1853 sidewheeler) =

Steamboat in XIX century United States

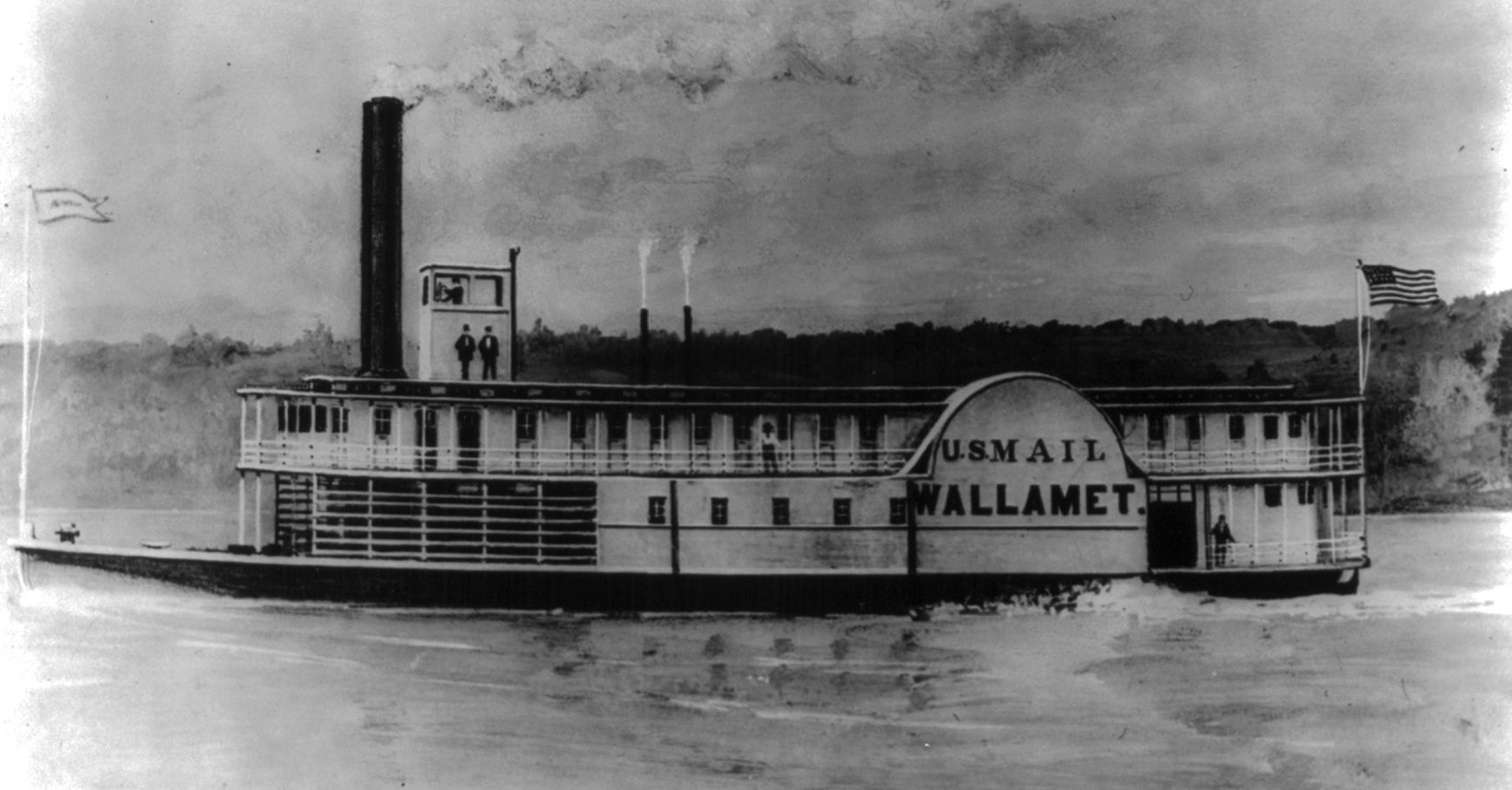
- Steamer Wallamet in Oregon service.

History
- Name: Wallamet
- Route: Willamette, Columbia, Sacramento and San Joaquin rivers
- In service: 1853
- Out of service: 1857
- Fate: Dismantled, 1860

General characteristics
- Type: inland shallow draft passenger/freighter/towboat
- Length: 150 ft (46 m)
- Beam: 23 ft (7 m) (measured over hull)
- Depth: 5.0 ft (2 m) depth of hold
- Propulsion: steam engines; sidewheels

Wallamet was a sidewheel-driven steamboat that operated on the Willamette and Columbia rivers in Oregon and later on the Sacramento and San Joaquin rivers in California. Built in a Mississippi river style that was not suited to the conditions of these rivers, and suffering from construction defects, Wallamet was not a financially successful vessel. The name of this vessel is often seen spelled as Willamette.

== Design and launch ==
Wallamet was designed by Capt. John McCrosky and associates in the Mississippi style of river boats, a sidewheeler, with twin smokestacks placed forward of the pilot house. McCrosky was reported to have "had a mania for building steamers of the Mississippi type. John T. Thomas (1808-1890) was the builder of Wallamet, as well as many other steamers.

There were sixty staterooms in the boat's upper saloon, and it could carry 400 tons of freight. Wallamet had two high pressure steam engines. Each engine was a single cylinder, with 14 inch inside diameter cylinder driving a piston 60 inches long. Wallamet was 150 feet long, 23 foot beam (measured over hull), and 5 feet depth of hold, with a registered tonnage of 272 tons. Another source gives different dimensions for the steamer: 140 feet long, 26 foot beam, depth of hold 6 feet, 150 tons.

Wallemet was launched on August 11, 1853, at Canemah, Oregon. There were about 50 to 60 persons on board the boat at the time of the launch, but no women, who watched the launch from the shore. The boat's name was announced by Asa Lovejoy. The steamer slid cleanly into the water, and once in, continued nearly across the river and had to be retrieved by the sidewheeler Oregon. With the launch of Wallamet, there were now four steamers operating out of Canemah. Wallamet was said by the editor of a local newspaper to be "calculated to afford greater facilities for freight and passage than have ever before been offered."

== Operations on the upper Willamette ==
In 1854, Absalom Hedges and John Miller organized the Defiance Line to provide steamboat service to points on the upper Willamette. Wallamet was to be the principal vessel of the new line. The Fenix was also part of the Defiance Line.

In February 1854, Wallamet, under Capt. A.F. Hedges, was running a regular route between Canemah and Corvallis. Wallamet departed Canemah every Monday and Thursday.

== Destruction of Gazelle ==
Wallamet was present in 1854 at Canemah, when the new steamer Gazelle was destroyed by a boiler explosion. On April 8, 1854, at 6:30 a.m., Gazelle had come over to Canemah from the long wharf built above the Falls on the western side of the river above Linn City, sometimes called the "basin". The chief engineer, Tonie (or Toner), had run Gazelle across the river, and stopped briefly alongside Wallamet to take on freight. Wallamet was then under command of Capt. Charles H Bennett, whose crew was just then preparing for breakfast.

On board Gazelle, the steam was "howling from escape pipe with a deafening roar." The chief engineer then moved Gazelle further to a wharf-boat. The wharf-boat was either "a few rods" or 100 yards upriver from Willamet.

About one minute later, at about 6:40 a.m. both boilers exploded on Gazelle. Captain Bennett on board Wallamet exclaimed: "My God, the Gazelle has blown up — man your small boats." This order was just in time, as already people blown off Gazelle were starting to float downriver towards the falls. About 60 people had been on board Gazelle. At least twenty people were instantly killed, and almost everyone else was injured, including four people who died later.

The pilot of Wallamet, James M. Fudge, had stepped on board Gazelle when Gazelle had come alongside, and had been blown into the river with his lower spine severed by a flying piece of debris. He died within a few minutes.

The day after the explosion, Wallamet proceeded upriver under Captain George A. Pease (b.1830 or 1831), as pilot, stopping at every landing to leave off the wounded and the dead. The conduct of Rev. J.L. Parrish, of Salem, and Capt. Bennett of the steamer Wallamet, was particularly praised thirty years later by a crewman who had been on Wallamet at the time of the explosion.

== Sent to lower river ==
In July 1854, Capt. A.S. Murray (1827–1914), Capt. Richard Hoyt, and the Brock & Ogden concern bought Wallamet and, on August 2, had the boat lined over Willamette Falls to the lower Willamette river. Just one man, Capt. George Jerome (1823–1886), was on board Wallamet while the dangerous lining operation was occurring,

Once below the falls, Wallamet took the place of the Lot Whitcomb on the route from Portland to Astoria, Oregon. Wallemet ran in opposition to Multnomah, which held the mail contract, and the competition between the vessels reduced rates on the Astoria route to $8 per passenger and the same for a ton of freight.

== Transfer to California ==
An effusive welcome in Stockton

At an early hour yesterday morning, the ringing of bells and the booming of cannon announced the arrival of an opposition steamer. The peel of bells and cannon found an echo in every citizen's breast, and all through the day there was a change for the better visibly marked in every man's countenance. There has been on the part of the people a decided earnestness in this steamboat movement, and the arrival of the Wallamet seemed to give rise to more enthusiasm. Everybody was on the qui vive, and every citizen appeared to thank the "day of our deliverance."
Sacramento Daily Union, Jan. 26, 1855, quoting the Daily San Joaquin Republican.

Captain Murray decided to transfer Wallamet to California, and in September 1854, the boat was towed south to San Francisco by the steamer Peytonia. Ownership changed prior to the transfer, with the purchase price for the steamer reported to be $30,000.

An earlier Willamette steamer, the Lot Whitcomb had also recently been sent to the San Francisco area, on August 12, 1854, also in tow of the Peytonia. Lot Whitcomb was to serve as opposition to the California Steam Navigation Company, then the dominant steamboat concern on the Sacramento river. Rather than face the potential competition, C.S.N simply bought the Lot Whitcomb, and towed it off to a mud flat near Oakland, California and left it there until it decayed away.

Murray's hope was that C.S.N., threatened with competition, would buy the steamer and "plant it" just as it had with the Lot Whitcomb. However, C.S.N. did not pick up the Wallamet, which ended up running for a year or two on the Sacramento, but made little money.

Wallamet arrived at San Francisco in October 1854. As of Tuesday, October 16, 1854, under Capt. R. Hoyt, Wallamet was operating out of San Francisco from a berth at the Pacific wharf on a run to Sacramento. On October 27, 1854, Wallamet, running as an opposition steamer, departed Sacramento headed down river for San Francisco Bay. Also departing the same day was the Helen Hensley, a steamboat owned by the California Steam Navigation Company. Fares charged by Wallamet were $1 and $3, while Hensley, in a predatory pricing tactic, reduced fares to 25 cents.

Wallamet also operated on the San Joaquin river. Wallamet was placed on the San Joaquin river in January 1855 by the Southern Miners Steamboat Association, to run between San Francisco and Stockton in opposition to the C.S.N. The steamer's arrival in Stockton on January 24, 1855, was greeted with jubilation by the local populace.

On Thursday, March 1, 1855, a passenger on Wallamet, Herman Mosher, recovered a verdict of $500 in his favor for forcible ejection from a stateroom on board the steamer.

On July 1, 1857, Wallamet was reported to be lying idle at Sacramento along with a number of other steamers. Wallamet was still tied up to the river bank on October 30, 1858, but was not completely abandoned, as a watchman was stationed aboard.

According to one source, after running for a short period on the Sacramento River, and losing money the whole time, Wallamet's owners were forced to sell the vessel to the California Steam Navigation Company, which ran the boat briefly, then put it reserve until it rotted. After that the engines were removed and placed in the small steamer Swallow which also operated for only s short time. Swallow, a sternwheeler, was launched November 14, 1860, at Steamboat Point in San Francisco.
