= Black Hawk (steamboat) =

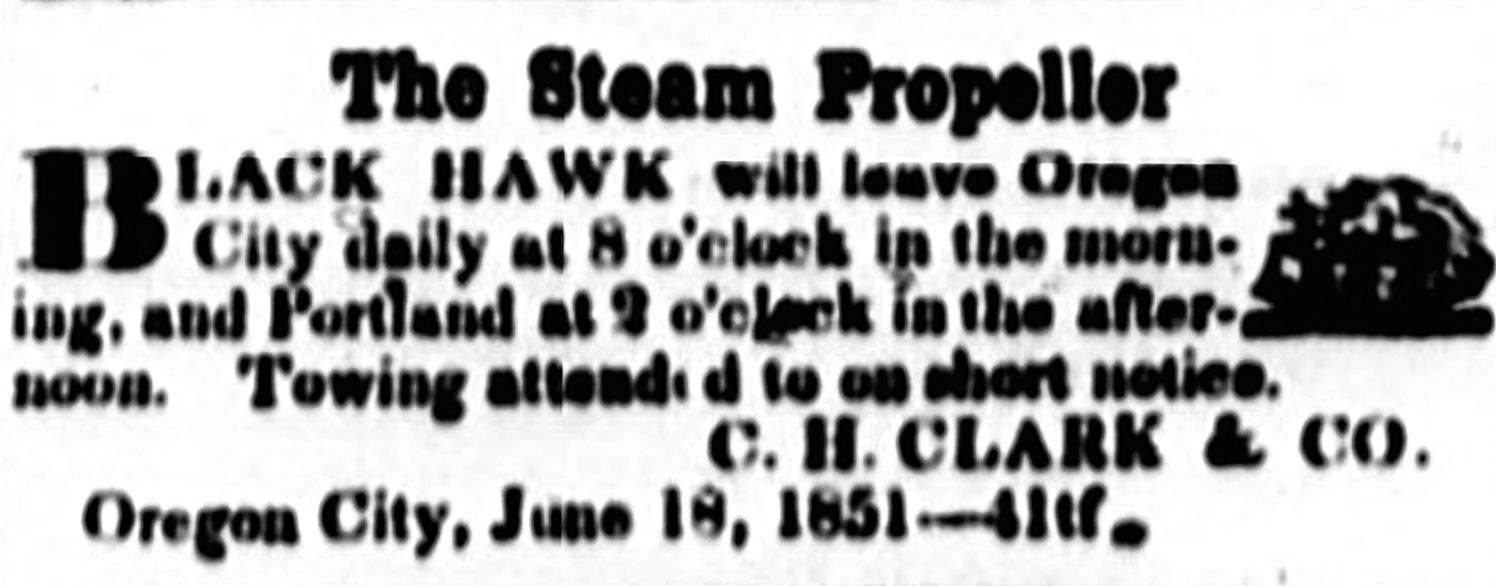
- Advertisement for steamer Blackhawk.

History
- Name: Black Hawk
- Operator: Jacob Kamm; C.H. Clark & Co.
- Route: Sacramento River, Willamette River
- Fate: Dismantled, 1852

General characteristics
- Type: inland shallow draft passenger/freighter/towboat
- Length: 30 ft (9 m)
- Beam: 7 ft (2 m)
- Depth: 3.0 ft (1 m) depth of hold
- Installed power: steam engine
- Propulsion: propeller
- Notes: Iron hull

Black Hawk was one of three small iron-propeller driven steamboats manufactured in Philadelphia in about 1850 and shipped to the west coast of United States to be placed in river service. The other boats were Eagle and Major Redding. These boats were some of the earliest steamers to operate on the Willamette and Columbia rivers. They could carry about 12 passengers and perhaps a ton of cargo. The boats had to be small to make the run to Oregon City, which passed through the Clackamas rapids a short distance downriver from the town.

== Dimensions ==
Black Hawk was 30 feet long, with a beam of 7 feet and depth of hold of 3 feet. The boat's tonnage was 10. Tonnage was a measure of volume and not weight.

== Sacramento river service ==
Black Hawk ran on the Sacramento River in 1850 under captain and engineer Jacob Kamm. When Kamm left the vessel in charge of the second engineer, a boiler pump malfunction caused the boiler to overheat and set fire to the boat. Kamm was able to patch up Black Hawk and it could still reach Sacramento, but this was, according to Kamm's remarks in 1911, the swan song of the Black Hawk which was condemned.

== Transfer to Oregon ==
Competition among the early steamboats on the Willamette

In the first year that steamers ran on the Columbia and the Willamette, the strip from Portland to the Falls became infested with boats, all competing for the trade between those places. As it is doubtful whether the two towns together could muster over a couple of thousand inhabitants, pickings for the steamers were slim, and the fight raged furiously between the little propellers Eagle, Black Hawk, and Major Redding, which were joined the next year by the Allan, the Washington, and the pioneer Columbia.

— Randall V. Mills, Sternwheelers Up Columbia (1947)

Black Hawk was brought to Oregon by Capt. Richard Hoyt Sr. (1814–1862) from San Francisco on the barque Ocean Bird.

Black Hawk arrived at the landing at Oregon City on Sunday, May 18, 1851. There was speculation that Blackhawk could navigate the Tualatin river.

On May 29, 1851, Blackhawk, under Capt. Charles Clark, was making a regular daily run between Oregon City and Portland, departing Oregon City in the morning, and returning the same day from Portland.

An advertisement promised that "strict punctuality, as to the time of starting, will be observed." Also on May 29, 1851, the editor of the Oregon Spectator reported that the captain of the Black Hawk had "chalked our hat", that is, provided the editor free passage on the steamer, on a trip to Portland and back.

On Saturday, May 31, 1851, Black Hawk had to carry the freight and passengers of the new sidewheeler Lot Whitcomb, when the Whitcomb, a much larger vessel, broke a few paddle buckets on one wheel during an excursion to the Cascades Rapids, and as a result had to stop at the foot of the Clackamas Rapids rather than proceeding on to Oregon City.

In June, 1851, Martin Angel, a resident of Oregon City, bought a one-half interest in the Black Hawk.

By June 26, 1851, the boat's management, C.H. Clark & Co., were advertising more specific departure times, 8:00 a.m. from Oregon City, and 2:00 p.m. from Portland, with towing "attended to on short notice."

The water level in the Willamette River fell greatly in the last two weeks of July, 1851. Despite the low level of water, Black Hawk, and another steamboat, the sidewheeler Columbia, were still able to make their runs.

In September 1851, the steamer Black Hawk was taken below the Clackamas Rapids, to be operated on the river away from Oregon City. About November 1, 1851, Black Hawk returned to Oregon City, running a route from there to the Clackamas Rapids and back. The Willamette River was then rising because of fall rains, making steamboat navigation much easier.

== Disposition ==
Black Hawk was dismantled in 1852.
