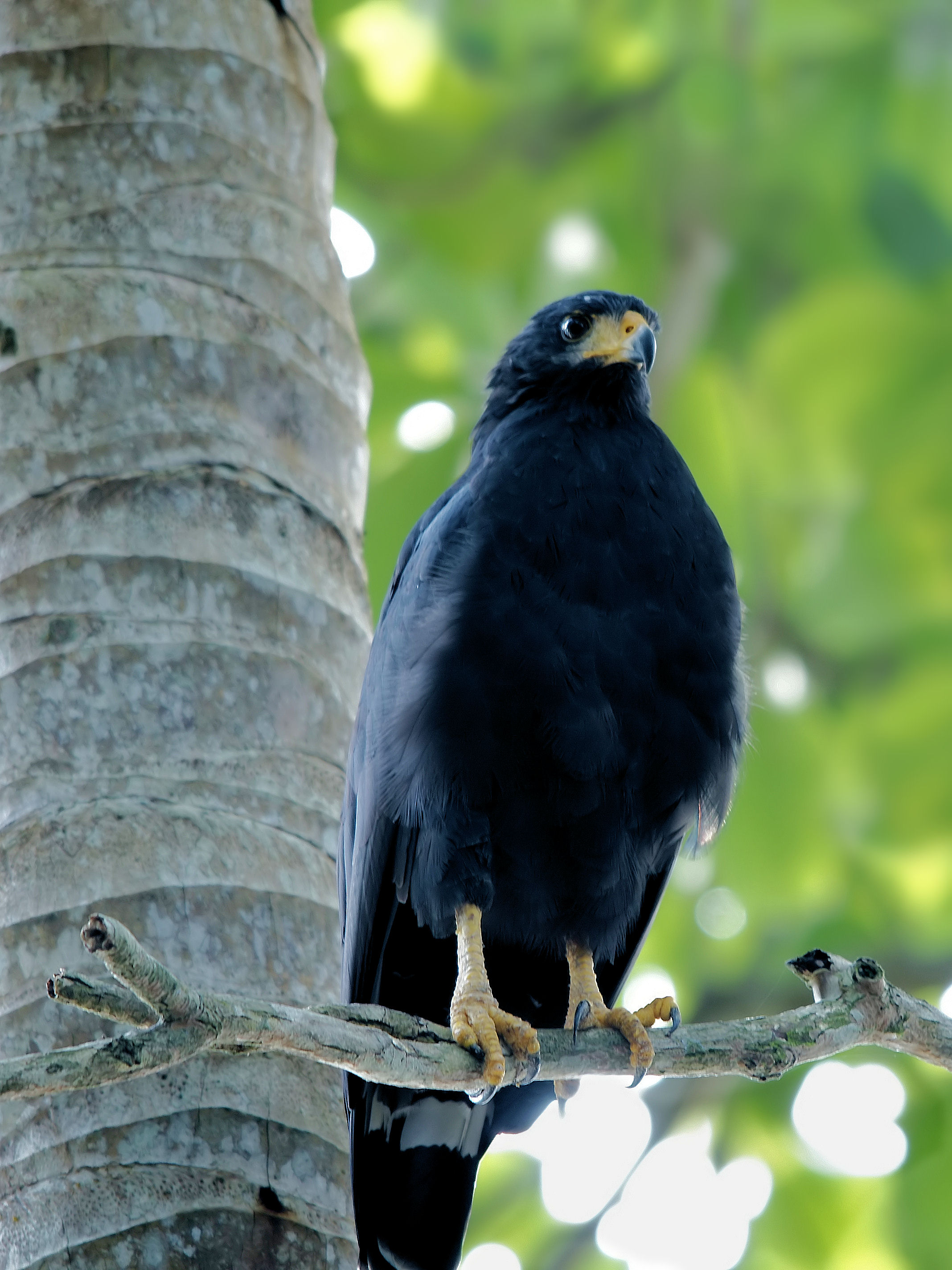
- Common black hawk in Costa Rica

Conservation status
- Least Concern (IUCN 3.1)

Scientific classification
- Kingdom: Animalia
- Phylum: Chordata
- Class: Aves
- Order: Accipitriformes
- Family: Accipitridae
- Genus: Buteogallus
- Species: B. anthracinus

Binomial name
- Buteogallus anthracinus (Deppe, 1830)

Subspecies
- B. a. anthracinus - (Deppe, 1830); B. a. utilensis - Twomey, 1956; B. a. rhizophorae - Monroe, 1963; B. a. bangsi - (Swann, 1922); B. a. subtilis - (Thayer & Bangs, 1905)

= Common black hawk =

Species of bird

The common black hawk (Buteogallus anthracinus) is a bird of prey in the family Accipitridae, which also includes the eagles, hawks, and vultures.

== Description ==
The adult common black-hawk is 43–53 cm (17–21 in) long and weighs 930 g (33 oz) on average. It has very broad wings, and is mainly black or dark gray. The short tail is black with a single broad white band and a white tip. The bill is black and the legs and cere are yellow. The adults resemble zone-tailed hawks, but have fewer white bars on their tail and are larger in size.

Sexes are similar, but immature birds are dark brown above with spotting and streaks. Their underparts are buff to whitish with dark blotches, and the tail has a number of black and white bars.

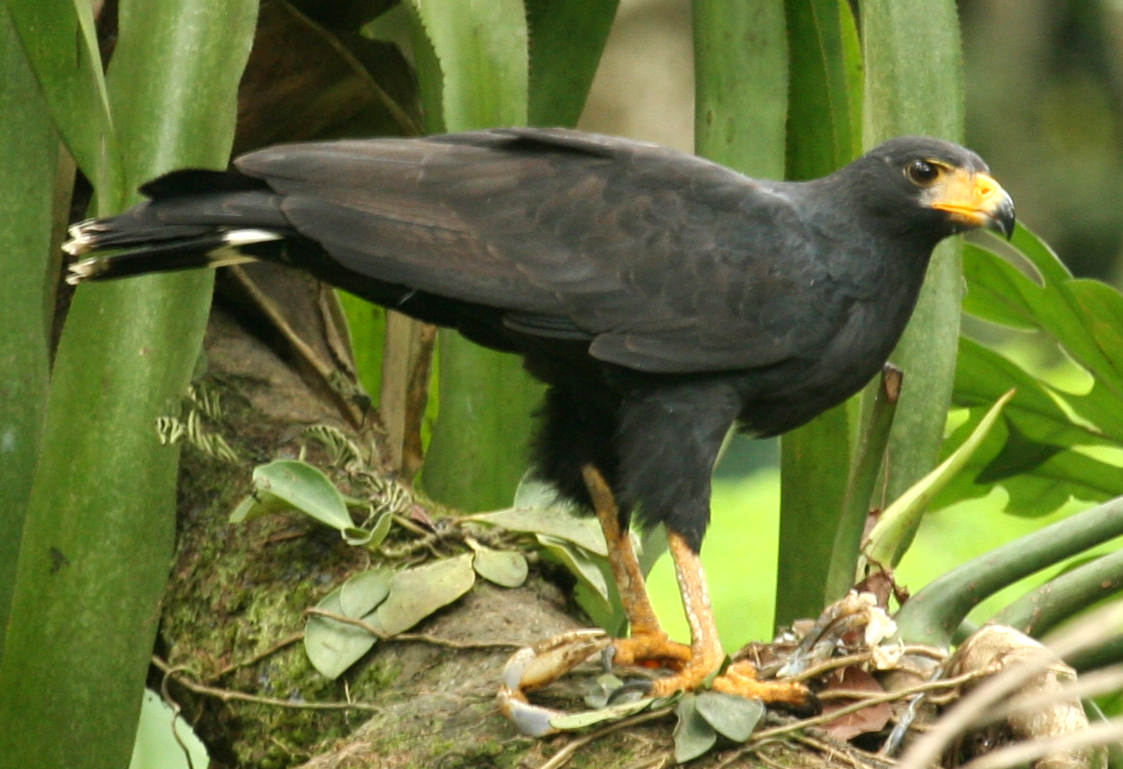
Common Black Hawk, near Punta Uva Beach, Costa Rica

=== Subspecies ===
It formerly included the Cuban black-hawk (Buteogallus gundlachii) as a subspecies. The mangrove black hawk, traditionally considered a distinct species, is now generally considered a subspecies, B. a. subtilis, of the common black-hawk.

== Distribution and habitat ==
The common black-hawk is a breeding bird in the warmer parts of the Americas, from the Southwestern United States through Central America to Venezuela, Peru, Trinidad, and the Lesser Antilles. It is a mainly coastal, resident bird of mangrove swamps, estuaries and adjacent dry open woodland, though there are inland populations, including a migratory population in north-western Mexico and Arizona.

== Behaviour ==
=== Breeding ===
The bird builds a platform nest of sticks fifteen to one hundred feet above the ground in a tree, often a mangrove. Nests are often reused and tend to grow bigger. It lays one to three eggs (usually one), which are whitish with brown markings.

It has hybridized naturally with the red-shouldered hawk (Buteo lineatus) in Sonoma County, California, USA. This natural hybridization between different genera of hawks is rare.

=== Feeding ===
It feeds mainly on crabs (especially land crabs) and crayfish, but will also take small vertebrates (such as fish, frogs, turtle hatchlings, lizards, snakes and small, young or injured birds and mammals), carrion (in form of dead fish) and eggs. The common black hawk also supplements its diet with a variety of insects, including grasshoppers, caterpillars and wasp larvae. This species is often seen soaring, with occasional lazy flaps, and has a talon-touching aerial courtship display. The call is a distinctive piping spink-speenk-speenk-spink-spink-spink.

== Status and conservation ==
The common black hawk is protected in the far north of its range (in the USA) under the Migratory Bird Treaty Act of 1918.

== Bibliography ==
- Hilty, Steven L. (2003). Birds of Venezuela. Princeton University Press. ISBN 0-7136-6418-5.
- ffrench, Richard; O'Neill, John Patton; Eckelberry, Don R. (1991). A Guide to the Birds of Trinidad and Tobago (2nd ed.). Ithaca, N.Y.: Comstock Publishing. ISBN 0-8014-9792-2.
- Howell, Steve N.G.; Webb, Sophie (1995). A Guide to the Birds of Mexico and Northern Central America. Oxford University Press. ISBN 0-19-854012-4.
