= Blackhawk, Ohio =

Unincorporated community in Ohio, U.S.

Coordinates: 39°19′18″N 84°04′18″W

Blackhawk is an unincorporated community in Warren County, in the U.S. state of Ohio. A variant spelling is "Black Hawk".

== History ==
Black Hawk was platted in 1838. The community has the name of Black Hawk, an Indian chieftain.
