= Winneshiek Players =

Coordinates: 42°17′58.2″N 89°37′28.6″W

The Winneshiek Players is an amateur theater group in Freeport, Illinois. It was founded in 1916 and has offered a season of performances for every year since 1926. The Winneshiek Players claims to be the oldest continuously operating volunteer (amateur) theater group in the United States. Its current building first hosted a theatrical performance in April, 1936. In the 20 years before then, productions were staged in various indoor and outdoor locations around the town of Freeport.
