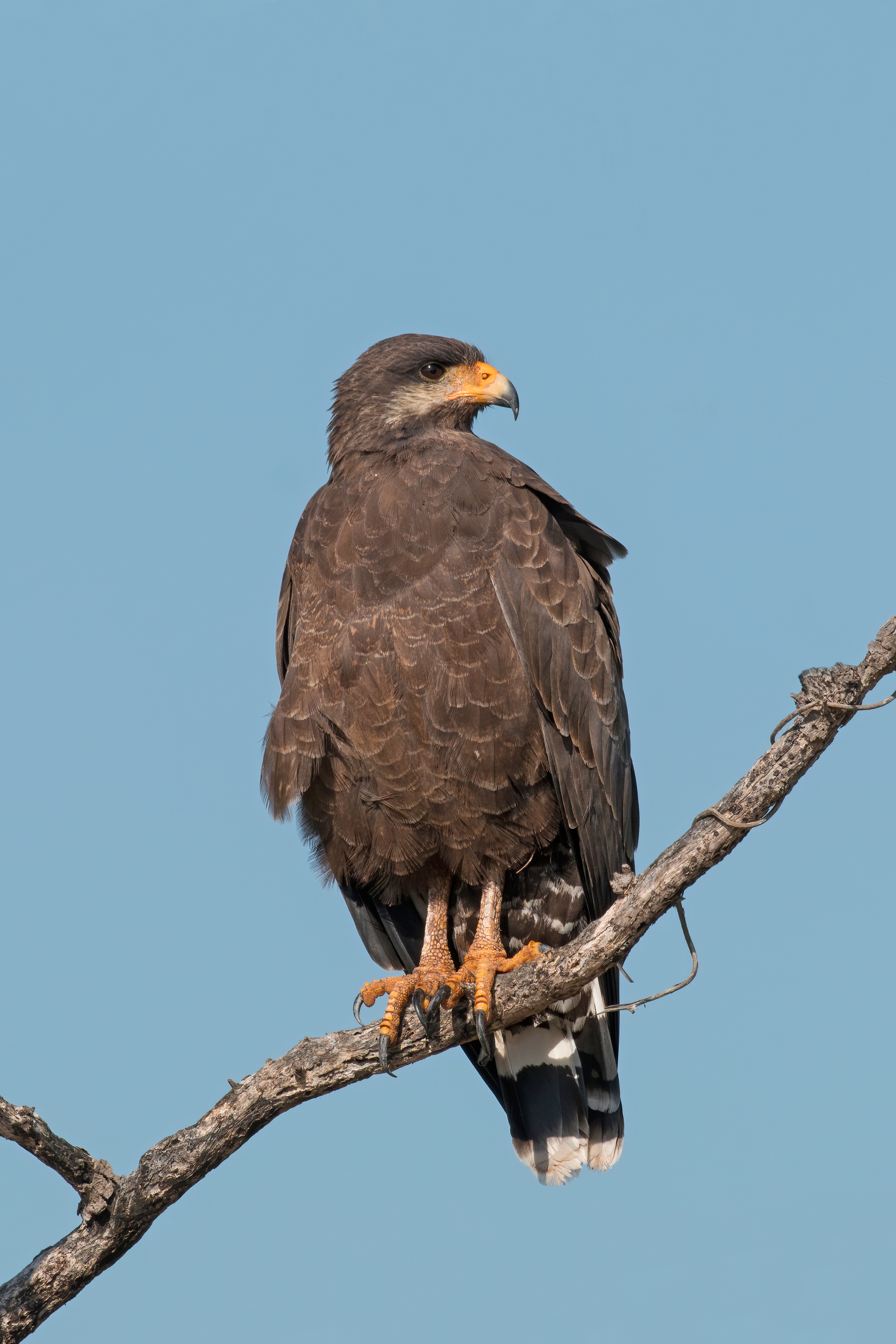

Conservation status
- Near Threatened (IUCN 3.1)

Scientific classification
- Kingdom: Animalia
- Phylum: Chordata
- Class: Aves
- Order: Accipitriformes
- Family: Accipitridae
- Genus: Buteogallus
- Species: B. gundlachii

Binomial name
- Buteogallus gundlachii (Cabanis, 1855)

Synonyms
- Buteogallus anthracinus gundlachii

= Cuban black hawk =

Species of bird

The Cuban black hawk (Buteogallus gundlachii) is a bird of prey in the family Accipitridae. It is endemic to Cuba and several outlying cays.

== Taxonomy ==
German ornithologist Jean Cabanis described the Cuban black hawk in 1855. It was considered by most authorities to be a subspecies of the Mangrove Black Hawk (Buteogallus anthracinus), although aspects of its behavior were little studied. However, in 2007, the American Ornithologists' Union classified it as a separate species based on differing vocalizations and plumage patterns.

It is one of eight species in the New World genus Buteogallus.

== Description ==
The species has an average body length of 53 cm (21 in). The plumage is mainly dark brown verging on black. A lighter greyish or whitish patch may be present on the face between the bill and the eye. White patches at the base of the primary flight feathers are visible in flight. The tail is striped with wide black and white bands. The legs are yellow and the bill is yellow tipped in black. Generally, females tend to be slightly larger in size than males.

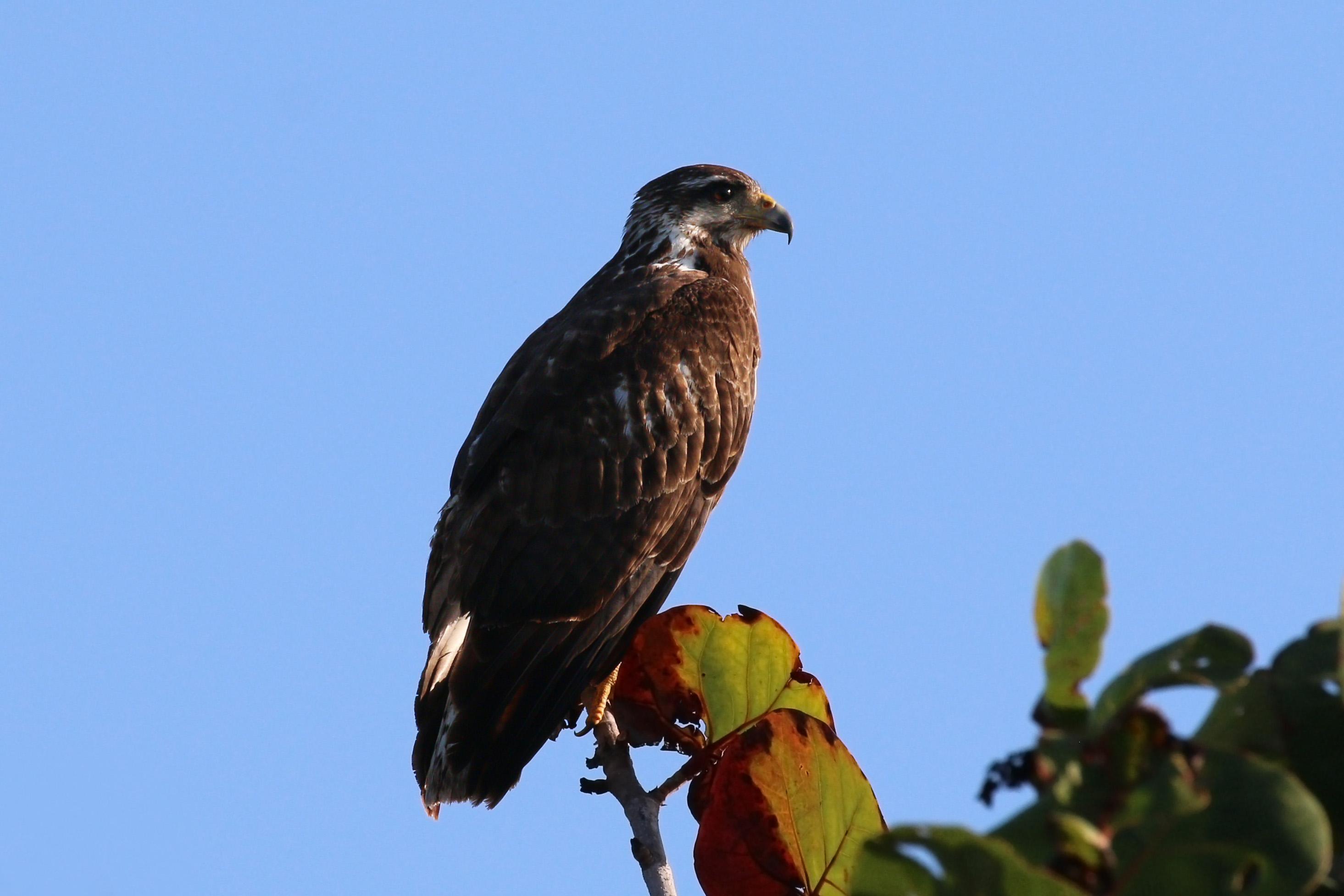
Juvenile

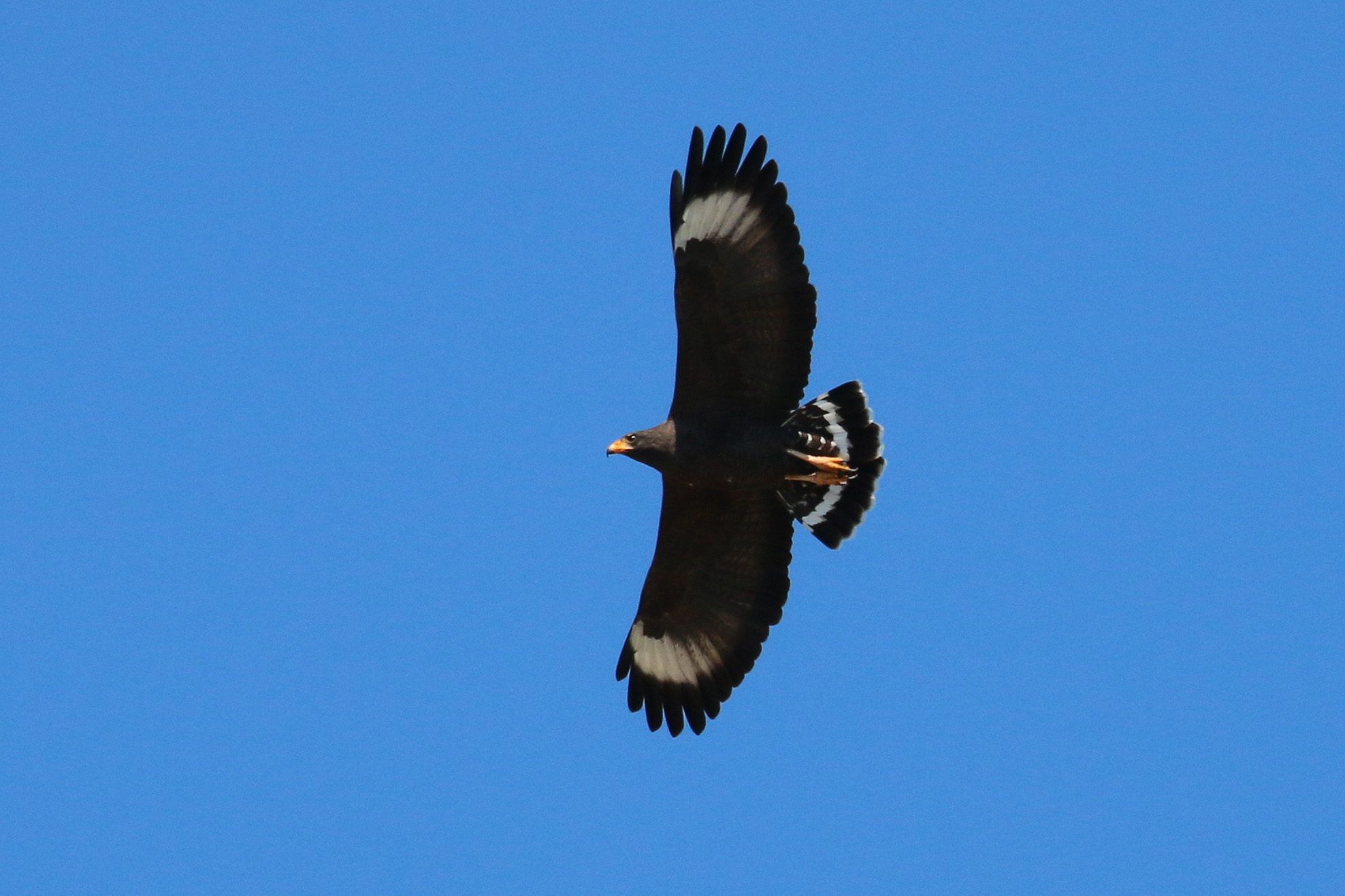

== Distribution and habitat ==
The Cuban black hawk is endemic to Cuba, where it is found primarily in coastal and mangrove regions and on Isla de la Juventud. It also occurs in wooded areas and even near mountains on the main island, and on several outlying cayes. However, the majority of its sightings are below 800 meters above sea level.

== Ecology ==
The species primarily feeds on crabs and also takes small vertebrates (fish, lizards, rodents and birds). Cuban black hawks breed mainly between March and June, but may do so as early as January. Nests are built in the sub-canopy of mangrove trees and are generally made out of mangrove twigs and lined with foliage. The female hawk lays 1–2 dark-spotted eggs (42–56 mm long). The species is monogamous and forms long-term pairs.

== Conservation ==
The species was first evaluated for the IUCN Red List in 2008 and is listed as Near Threatened. Total population size has been estimated at 15,000 birds. Numbers are suspected to be declining due to the continued degradation and draining of its habitat, which also increases fragmentation of the population.
