= Lake Winneshiek =

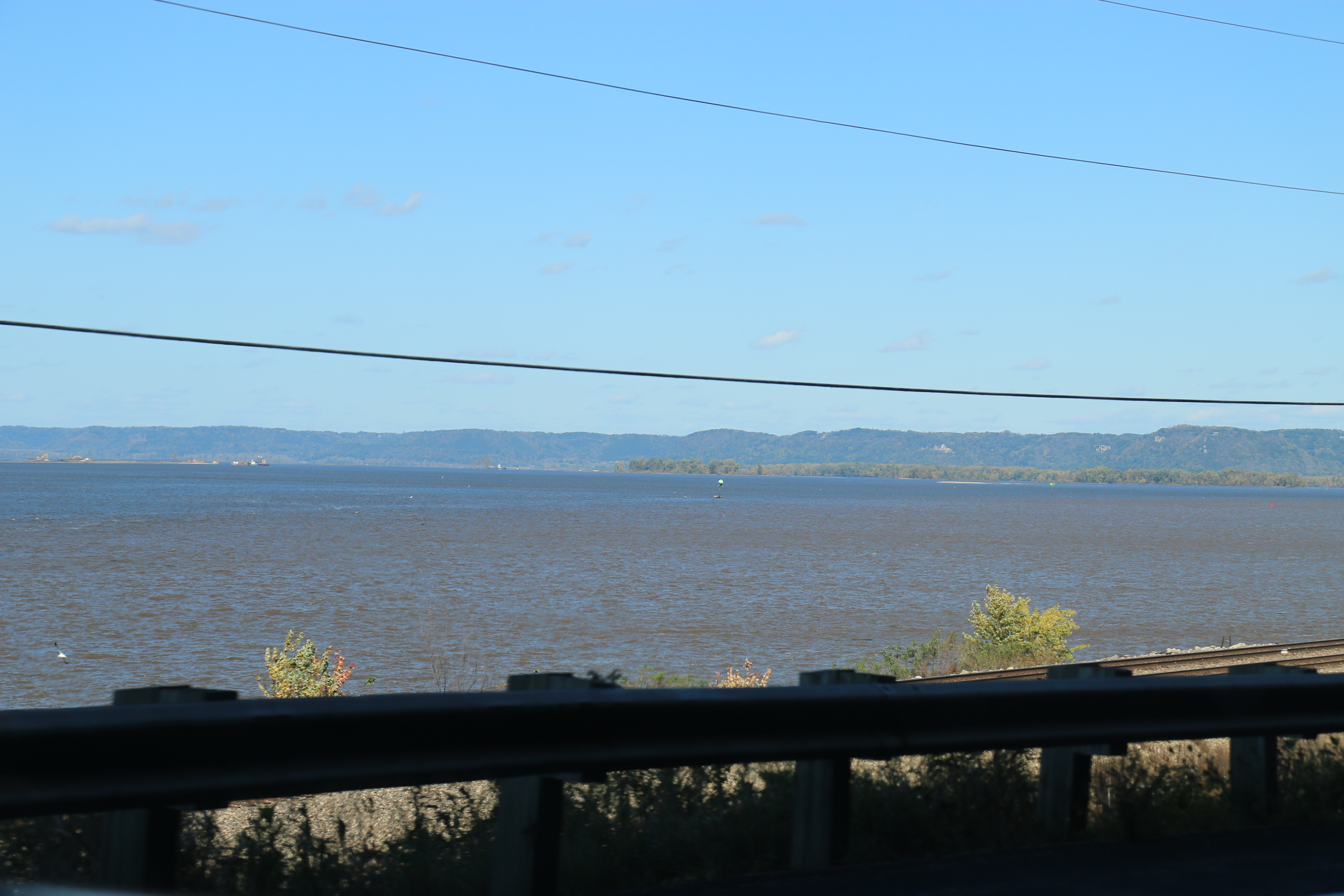
- Lake Winneshiek from WIS35

- Location within Wisconsin Location within the United States
- Location: Allamakee County, Iowa, Crawford County, Wisconsin, United States
- Coordinates: 43.31°N 91.07°W
- Type: reservoir
- Primary inflows: Upper Mississippi River
- Primary outflows: Upper Mississippi River
- Basin countries: United States
- Surface area: 6,000 acres (2,400 ha)

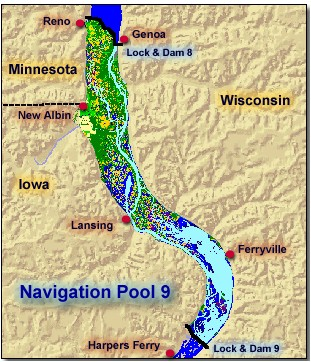
Lake Winneshiek (USGS)

Lake Winneshiek is the name given to that portion of Navigation Pool 9 impounded by Lock and Dam No. 9 between the dam to 4 miles south of the city of Lansing, Iowa on the Upper Mississippi River, near Ferryville, Wisconsin. It encompasses about 6,000 acres (24 km^{2}) and is part of the Upper Mississippi River National Wildlife and Fish Refuge. The Army Corps of Engineers has proposed constructing some islands in the lake in order to improve wildlife habitat.

== See also ==
- Wexford Creek
