= Blackhawk Park =

Park in Wisconsin, United States

- Location within Wisconsin Location within the United States
- Location: Vernon, Wisconsin, United States
- Coordinates: 43.461069°N 91.222341°W
- Named for: Chief Black Hawk, band leader and warrior of the Sauk American Indian tribe.
- Governing body: U.S. Army Corps of Engineers, St. Paul District

Blackhawk Park is a park in Vernon County, Wisconsin within the Driftless Area along the Mississippi River. The park features views of steep limestone bluffs and the river valleys. Wildlife viewing is a popular activity, including the variety of birds which inhabit or migrate through the park. Hiking trails, boat launch facilities, and camping are available. The park is owned and managed by the U.S. Army Corps of Engineers as a recreation area within Pool 9. The park is surrounded by the Upper Mississippi River National Wildlife and Fish Refuge.

== See also ==
- Lock and Dam No. 9
- List of locks and dams of the Upper Mississippi River
