= Blackhawk, West Virginia =

Unincorporated community in West Virginia, United States

- Unincorporated community
- Location within West Virginia Location within the United States
- Coordinates: 38°20′1″N 81°35′12″W
- Country: United States
- State: West Virginia
- County: Kanawha
- Elevation: 617 ft (188 m)
- Time zone: UTC-5 (Eastern (EST))
  - Summer (DST): UTC-4 (EDT)
- FIPS code: 1553917

Blackhawk is an unincorporated community in Kanawha County, West Virginia, United States.
