= USS Black Hawk (MHC-58) =

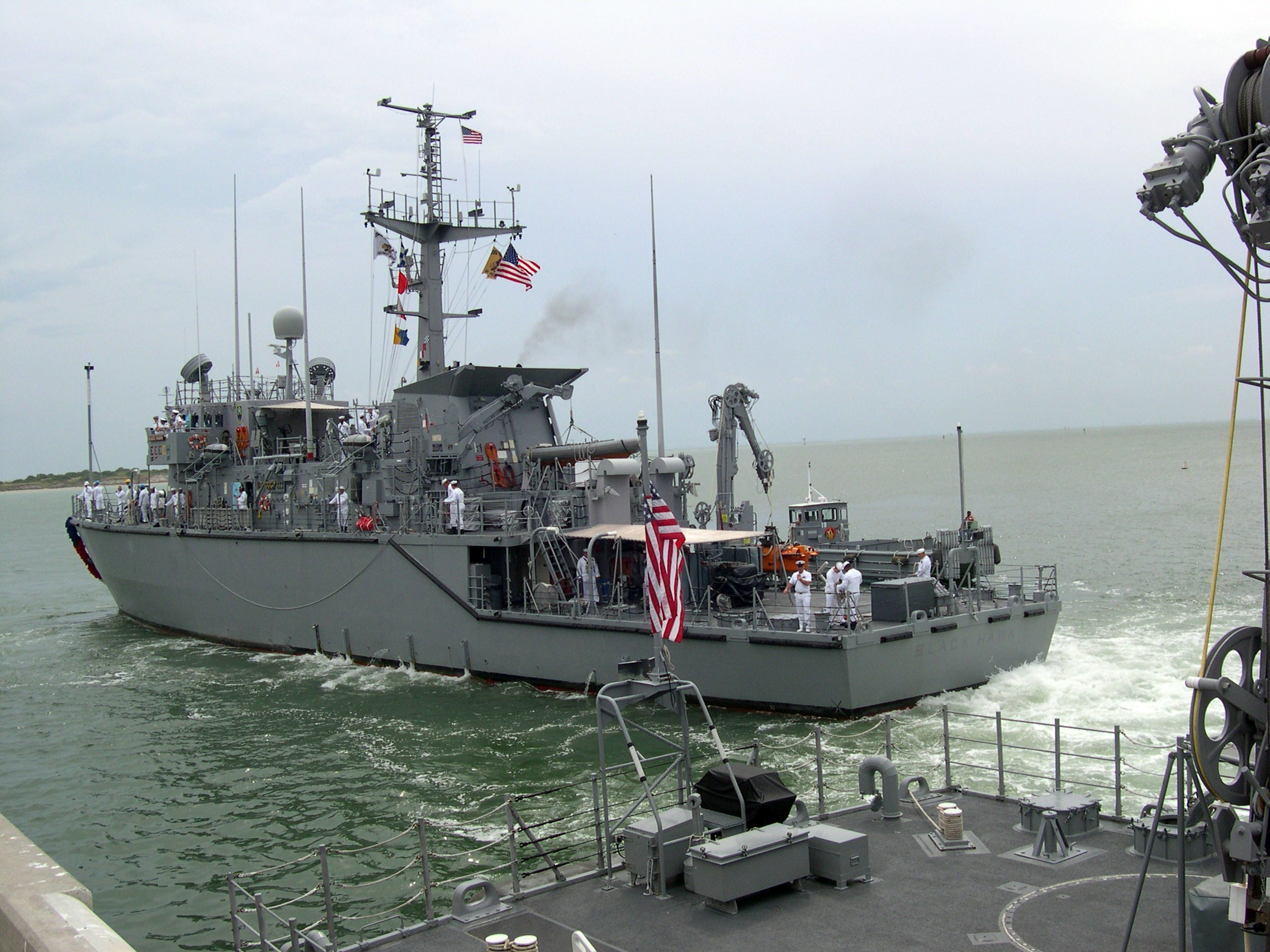
- USS Black Hawk, Ingleside, Texas, September 2004

History

United States
- Namesake: Black Hawk
- Ordered: 22 April 1992
- Builder: Intermarine USA
- Laid down: 3 September 1992
- Launched: 27 August 1994
- Acquired: 16 January 1996
- Commissioned: 11 May 1996
- Decommissioned: 1 December 2007
- Stricken: 1 December 2007
- Fate: Sold by U.S. General Services Administration for scrap, 8 May 2014
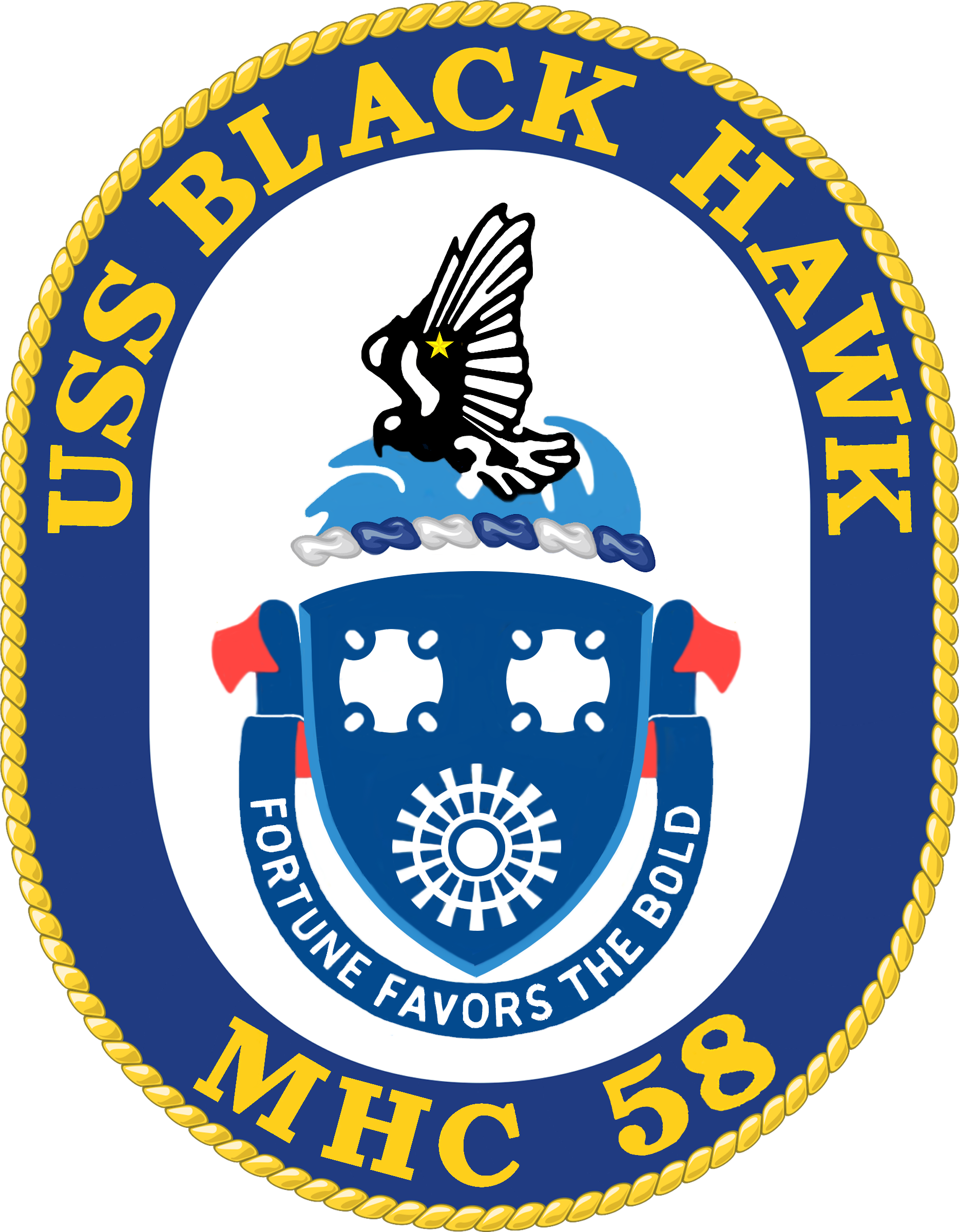
- Badge

General characteristics
- Class & type: Osprey-class coastal minehunter
- Displacement: 914 tons
- Length: 188 ft (57 m)
- Beam: 38 ft (12 m)
- Draft: 11 ft (3.4 m)
- Propulsion: Diesel Engines
- Speed: 14.7 knots (27.2 km/h; 16.9 mph)
- Complement: Officers: 5 Enlisted: 46

USS Black Hawk (MHC-58) was the eighth ship of Osprey-class coastal mine hunters.

She was commissioned 11 May 1996 and decommissioned 1 December 2007. Stricken from the Navy list 1 December 2007, sold by U.S. General Services Administration for scrap, 8 May 2014.

Black Hawk was of the MHC 51 class of ships, which are the world's largest glass reinforced plastic (GRP) ships and the first U.S. Navy ships designed solely for mine hunting; the technique of locating mines with sonar and neutralizing them with a remotely controlled underwater vehicle or divers.

The ship's mission was to clear harbor, coastal, and ocean waters of acoustic, magnetic and pressure/contact type mines utilizing reconnaissance, classification and neutralization tactics. Exceptionally low magnetic and acoustic signatures protect the ship against detonations during mine hunting operations.

Black Hawk (MHC-58) was the eighth ship in the U.S. MHC 51 (Osprey) Class Coastal Minehunter Program and the third U.S. Navy ship to bear that name. Black Hawk's keel was laid on September 3, 1992 and her christening and launching was on August 27, 1994 at Intermarine USA Corporation, Savannah, Georgia.

USS Black Hawk (MHC-58) was commissioned in ceremonies held on May 11, 1996, at Pier Two at the Naval Education Training Center, Newport, R.I.

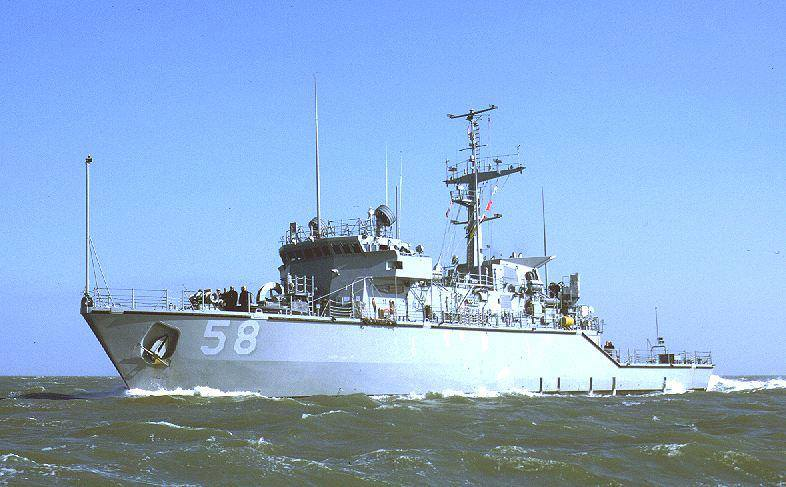

== Shield and crest ==
The ship's shield is dark blue and gold which are the colors traditionally used by the Navy to reflect the sea and excellence. Black is indicative of strength and stability. Blue denotes loyalty and devotion. White is emblematic of integrity and is symbolic of sea foam and breakers. The two mines recall the two previous ships of the same name and underscore the Black Hawk's mine hunting capabilities. The stylized paddlewheel is reminiscent of the first Black Hawk (a sidewheel steamer which served as flagship for Rear Admiral D.D. Porter and S.P. Lee, successive commander of the Mississippi Squadron). The paddle wheel further simulates a maritime compass suggesting leadership, guidance and alludes to navigation and the far reaching scope and mission of the past and present USS Black Hawk. The annulets incorporated into the paddle wheel suggest continual efforts. The paddle wheel, together with the two mines, symbolize the three ships bearing the name Black Hawk.

On the ship's crest, the waves of the sea denote the coastal waters, harbors, waterways and Navy theater of operations. The stylized black hawk reflects the continuous aggressiveness of the Black Hawk and its crew in carrying out their mission of minehunting, fueling, repairing and keeping combatant vessels in fighting trim. The name Black Hawk was derived from Indian Chief Black Hawk mentioned in history as the leader of the Sac & Fox tribes during the Black Hawk War. The star on the hawk's wing is commemorative of the battle star received by the second Black Hawk for her service in World War II.

== Previous namesakes ==
Two previous U.S. Navy ships have borne the name Black Hawk. The first Black Hawk was a side-wheeler river steamer that served as flagship of the Mississippi Squadron from December 1862 through May 1864. On 22 April 1865, she burned and sank. Her wreck was raised and sold in April 1867.

The second Black Hawk was commissioned 16 May 1918, and assigned as tender and flagship to the Mine Force in Inverness, Scotland from June 1918 until the end of World War I, when her base was shifted to the North Sea. She was designated a destroyer tender in November 1920 and she tended destroyer squadrons until 1942. She was decommissioned 15 August 1946. Black Hawk received one battle star for her service in World War II.
