= Blackhawk, Louisiana =

- Unincorporated community
- Location in Louisiana
- Coordinates: 31°09′21″N 91°38′09″W
- Country: United States
- States: Louisiana
- Parish: Concordia
- Elevation: 52 ft (16 m)
- GNIS feature ID: 553679

Blackhawk is a rural community near Shaw in Corcordia Parish, Louisiana, United States, on the west bank of the Mississippi River. It was one of the last rural areas of Louisiana to receive reliable phone service, after Centennial Wireless built a cellular tower in 2005. Crops grown at Blackhawk include sugarcane. In recent years, the Vicksburg District of the U.S. Army Corps of Engineers has worked on strengthening a section of the mainline Mississippi River levee system near Blackhawk.

== History ==
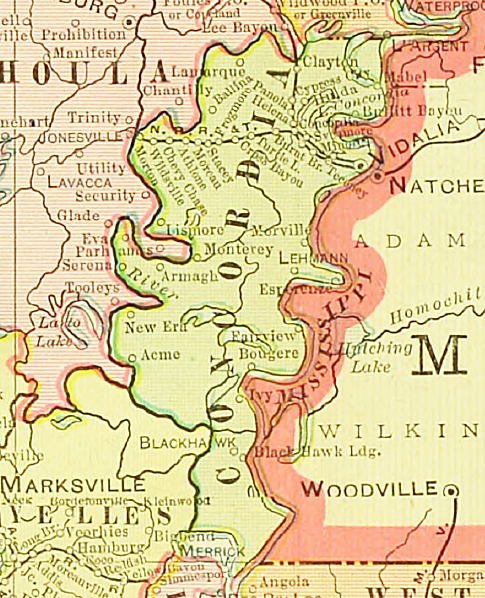
Blackhawk in Concordia Parish, 1902

According to the Official Register of the United States, in 1897 the postmaster of the Blackhawk post office in Concordia Parish was A. J. McCearly. Circa 1905, Our Lady of Lourdes Catholic Church in nearby Vidalia operated a station in Blackhawk.

In 1966, 2.6 miles of road between Blackhawk and Shaw was resurfaced, as part of the Mississippi River Parkway or Great River Road project.

In 2017, the Associated Press reported that farmer Matt Frey and his brothers were growing 150 acres of sugarcane in Blackhawk.

=== Levees ===
On May 2, 1912, the town of Blackhawk was flooded under nine feet of water, after a protection levee broke, letting in waters from Dog Tail crevasse. Residents had sufficient notice to take their belongings and livestock to safety.

In 1922, the Blackhawk, Shaw, and Bougiere areas were again heavily flooded, this time by the waters from the Ferriday crevasse. The water was almost twenty feet deep. Other towns affected included Ferriday and Waterproof.

In the 1980s, the Fifth Louisiana Levee Board and the United States Army Corps of Engineers worked on the Acme–Blackhawk levee enlargement program.

=== Telecommunications ===
In 2005, Blackhawk became one of three small "rural pockets" in Louisiana which finally received reliable phone service, after a cellular phone tower was constructed by Centennial Wireless near the Red River levee.

=== Blackhawk Plantation ===
In 1972, Blackhawk Plantation was sold to J. C. "Sonny" Gilbert of Sicily Island, reportedly for over $1 million. In 2005, a Moreauville man was charged with theft of livestock from Blackhawk Plantation, after he shot and killed a 13-point buck from his vehicle off of Highway 15 through an eight-foot tall game fence.

== Demographics ==
Blackhawk was a village with a population of 323 residents in the 1890 Census, and 125 in the 1900 census. The population of Blackhawk was 340 in 1910, and was 29 in 1940.

As of 2004, 100 households were reported living in the Shaw and Blackhawk area combined.
