= Lynxville, Wisconsin =

- Village
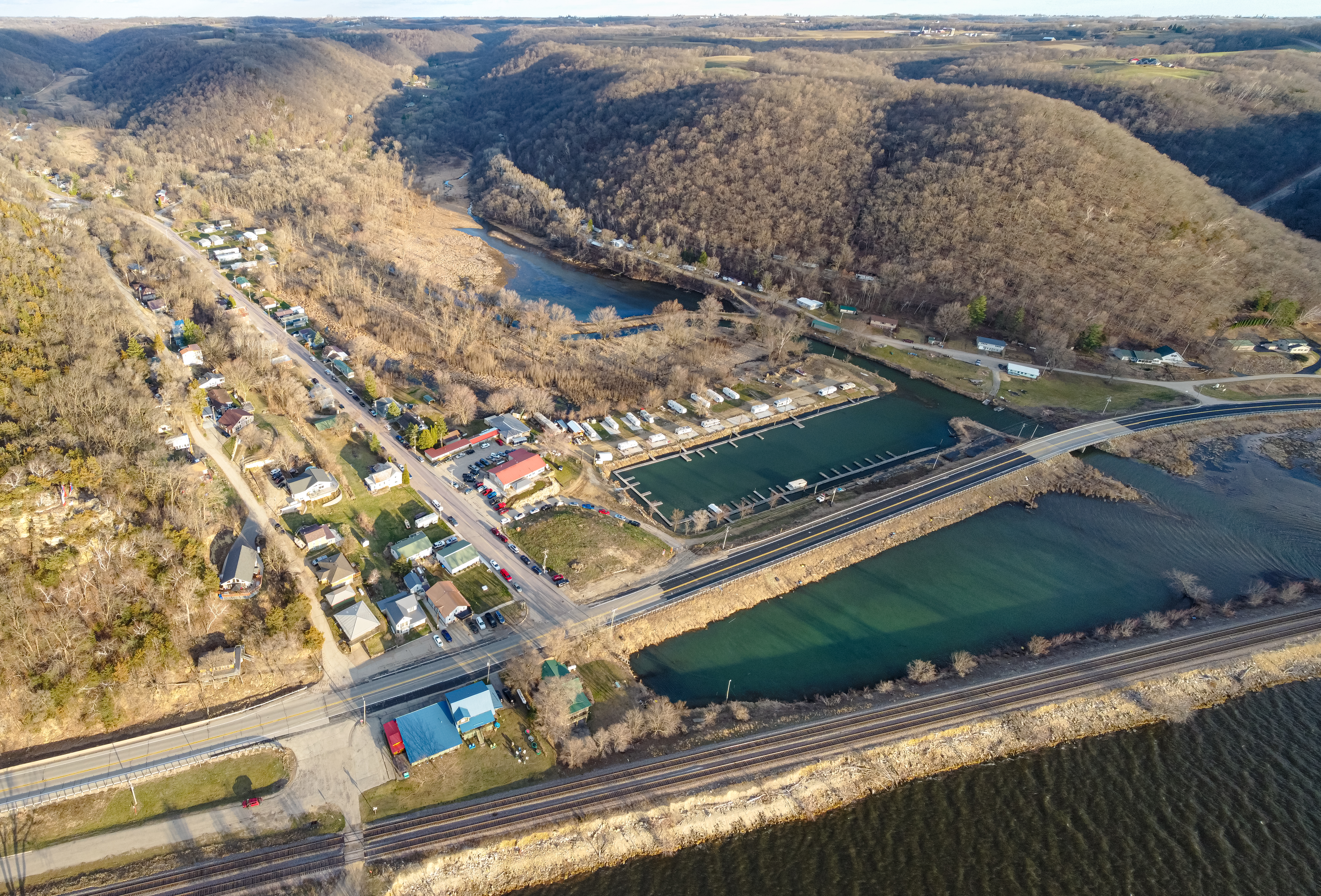
- Upper Mississippi, BNSF, and Wis-35 on the west side

- Location of Lynxville in Crawford County, Wisconsin.
- Coordinates: 43°14′51″N 91°3′14″W
- Country: United States
- State: Wisconsin
- County: Crawford

Area
  - Total: 1.37 sq mi (3.54 km^{2})
  - Land: 1.36 sq mi (3.51 km^{2})
  - Water: 0.015 sq mi (0.04 km^{2})
- Elevation: 636 ft (194 m)

Population (2020)
  - Total: 132
  - Density: 97.4/sq mi (37.6/km^{2})
- Time zone: UTC-6 (Central (CST))
  - Summer (DST): UTC-5 (CDT)
- Area code: 608
- FIPS code: 55-46675
- GNIS feature ID: 1568849

Lynxville is a village in Crawford County, Wisconsin, United States. The population was 132 at the 2020 census, representing no change from the 2010 census whatsoever.

== History ==
The village was named for the ship Lynx which brought the first surveyors to the area. Mitchel Caya was the first resident of Lynxville in 1848.

== Geography ==
Lynxville is located at 43°14′51″N 91°3′14″W (43.247540, -91.053911).

According to the United States Census Bureau, the village has a total area of 1.36 square miles (3.52 km^{2}), of which 1.35 square miles (3.50 km^{2}) is land and 0.01 square miles (0.03 km^{2}) is water.

=== Climate ===
Climate data for Lynxville, Wisconsin (Lock and Dam No. 9) (1991–2020 normals, extremes 1939–present)
Month	Jan	Feb	Mar	Apr	May	Jun	Jul	Aug	Sep	Oct	Nov	Dec	Year
Record high °F (°C)	57 (14)	70 (21)	82 (28)	93 (34)	94 (34)	100 (38)	101 (38)	101 (38)	100 (38)	92 (33)	75 (24)	66 (19)	101 (38)
Mean daily maximum °F (°C)	26.6 (−3.0)	31.4 (−0.3)	44.0 (6.7)	58.3 (14.6)	70.1 (21.2)	79.1 (26.2)	82.5 (28.1)	80.1 (26.7)	73.3 (22.9)	59.9 (15.5)	44.4 (6.9)	31.6 (−0.2)	56.8 (13.8)
Daily mean °F (°C)	18.1 (−7.7)	22.2 (−5.4)	34.6 (1.4)	47.8 (8.8)	59.4 (15.2)	68.9 (20.5)	72.8 (22.7)	70.7 (21.5)	63.3 (17.4)	50.5 (10.3)	36.5 (2.5)	24.3 (−4.3)	47.4 (8.6)
Mean daily minimum °F (°C)	9.6 (−12.4)	13.1 (−10.5)	25.3 (−3.7)	37.3 (2.9)	48.7 (9.3)	58.7 (14.8)	63.1 (17.3)	61.3 (16.3)	53.3 (11.8)	41.1 (5.1)	28.6 (−1.9)	17.0 (−8.3)	38.1 (3.4)
Record low °F (°C)	−43 (−42)	−34 (−37)	−34 (−37)	11 (−12)	27 (−3)	36 (2)	46 (8)	44 (7)	29 (−2)	18 (−8)	−8 (−22)	−29 (−34)	−43 (−42)
Average precipitation inches (mm)	1.29 (33)	1.18 (30)	2.03 (52)	3.75 (95)	4.68 (119)	5.50 (140)	4.47 (114)	3.82 (97)	3.79 (96)	2.53 (64)	2.02 (51)	1.45 (37)	36.51 (927)
Average snowfall inches (cm)	9.9 (25)	10.0 (25)	4.6 (12)	0.6 (1.5)	0.0 (0.0)	0.0 (0.0)	0.0 (0.0)	0.0 (0.0)	0.0 (0.0)	0.1 (0.25)	1.7 (4.3)	8.6 (22)	35.5 (90)
Average precipitation days (≥ 0.01 in)	8.9	7.8	9.1	11.3	12.6	12.0	9.8	8.9	9.3	9.3	7.7	9.0	115.7
Average snowy days (≥ 0.1 in)	6.1	5.1	2.2	0.3	0.0	0.0	0.0	0.0	0.0	0.1	1.3	5.3	20.4
Source: NOAA

== Demographics ==
Historical population
Census	Pop.	Note	%±
1880	155		—
1890	243		56.8%
1900	322		32.5%
1910	274		−14.9%
1920	253		−7.7%
1930	230		−9.1%
1940	233		1.3%
1950	217		−6.9%
1960	183		−15.7%
1970	149		−18.6%
1980	174		16.8%
1990	153		−12.1%
2000	176		15.0%
2010	132		−25.0%
2020	132		0.0%
U.S. Decennial Census

=== 2010 census ===
As of the census of 2010, there were 132 people, 63 households, and 45 families living in the village. The population density was 97.8 inhabitants per square mile (37.8/km^{2}). There were 101 housing units at an average density of 74.8 per square mile (28.9/km^{2}). The racial makeup of the village was 98.5% White and 1.5% African American. Hispanic or Latino of any race were 3.8% of the population.

There were 63 households, of which 25.4% had children under the age of 18 living with them, 54.0% were married couples living together, 11.1% had a female householder with no husband present, 6.3% had a male householder with no wife present, and 28.6% were non-families. 27.0% of all households were made up of individuals, and 6.4% had someone living alone who was 65 years of age or older. The average household size was 2.10 and the average family size was 2.40.

The median age in the village was 52.7 years. 18.2% of residents were under the age of 18; 4.5% were between the ages of 18 and 24; 18.2% were from 25 to 44; 37.8% were from 45 to 64; and 21.2% were 65 years of age or older. The gender makeup of the village was 51.5% male and 48.5% female.

=== 2000 census ===
As of the census of 2000, there were 176 people, 76 households, and 56 families living in the village. The population density was 127.0 people per square mile (48.9/km^{2}). There were 111 housing units at an average density of 80.1 per square mile (30.8/km^{2}). The racial makeup of the village was 98.86% White, 0.57% Asian, and 0.57% from two or more races. Hispanic or Latino of any race were 1.70% of the population.

There were 76 households, out of which 22.4% had children under the age of 18 living with them, 57.9% were married couples living together, 13.2% had a female householder with no husband present, and 26.3% were non-families. 22.4% of all households were made up of individuals, and 7.9% had someone living alone who was 65 years of age or older. The average household size was 2.32 and the average family size was 2.63.

In the village, the population was spread out, with 17.6% under the age of 18, 6.3% from 18 to 24, 26.1% from 25 to 44, 35.8% from 45 to 64, and 14.2% who were 65 years of age or older. The median age was 45 years. For every 100 females, there were 107.1 males. For every 100 females age 18 and over, there were 98.6 males.

The median income for a household in the village was $30,833, and the median income for a family was $35,000. Males had a median income of $17,083 versus $18,333 for females. The per capita income for the village was $14,979. None of the families and 6.7% of the population were living below the poverty line, including no under eighteens and 9.5% of those over 64.

== Transportation ==
Bus service towards La Crosse and Prairie du Chien is provided three times daily per direction by Scenic Mississippi Regional Transit. The BNSF line between Chicago and Minneapolis-St. Paul runs through Lynxville.

== Notable people ==
- Simon Benson, Oregon businessman

== Images ==
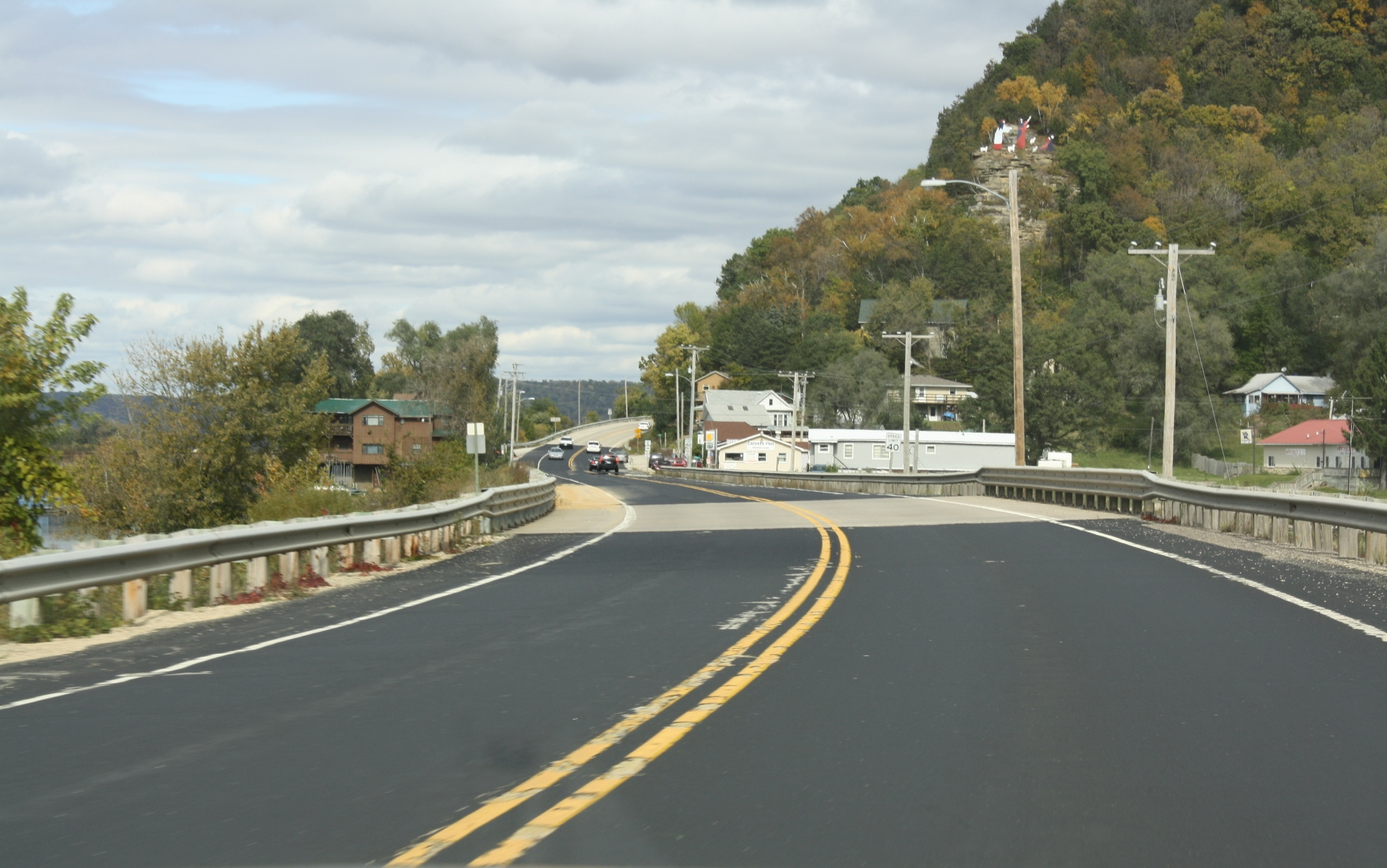
Looking north at downtown Lynxville

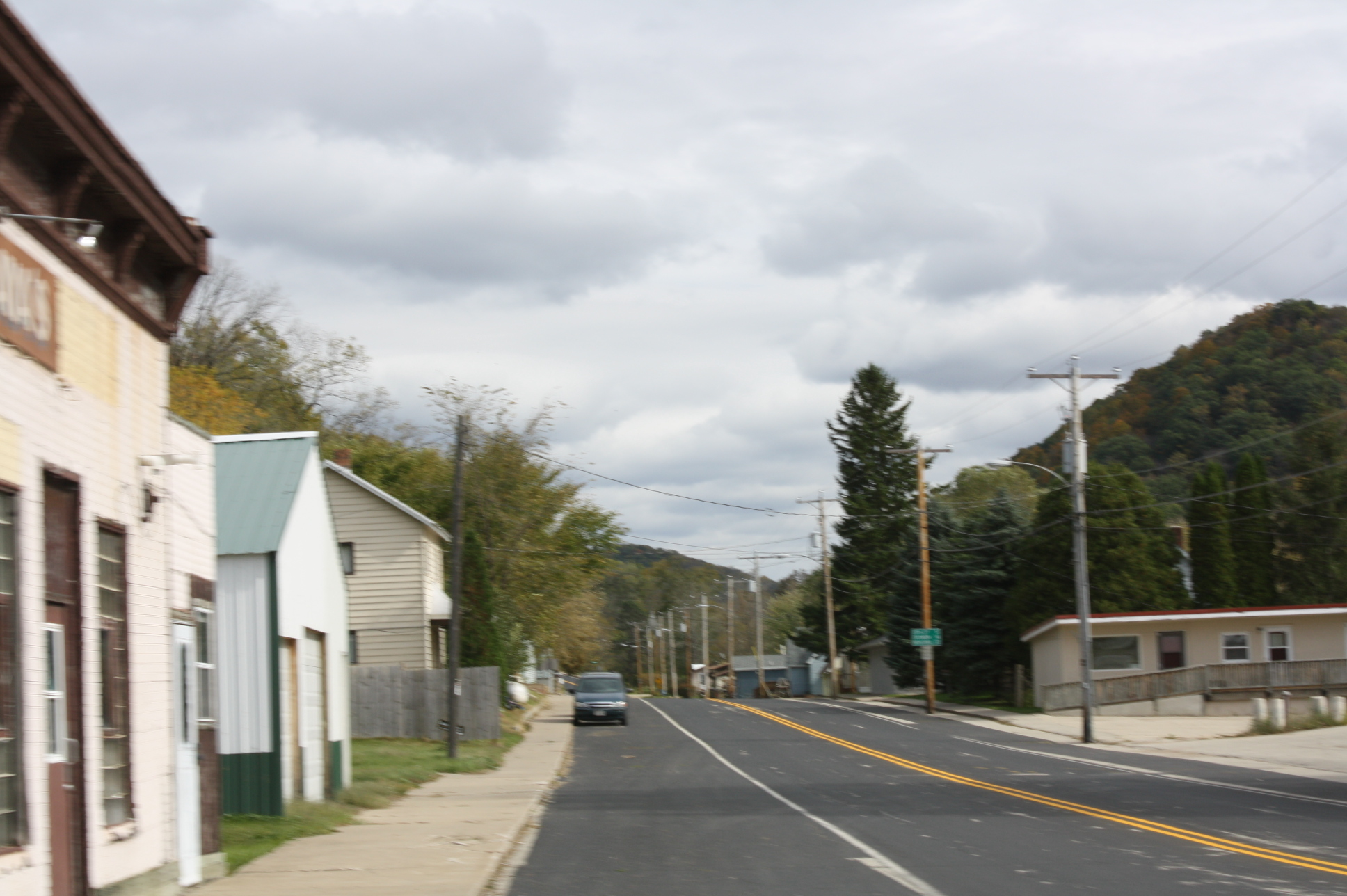
Looking east at Lynxville on County E

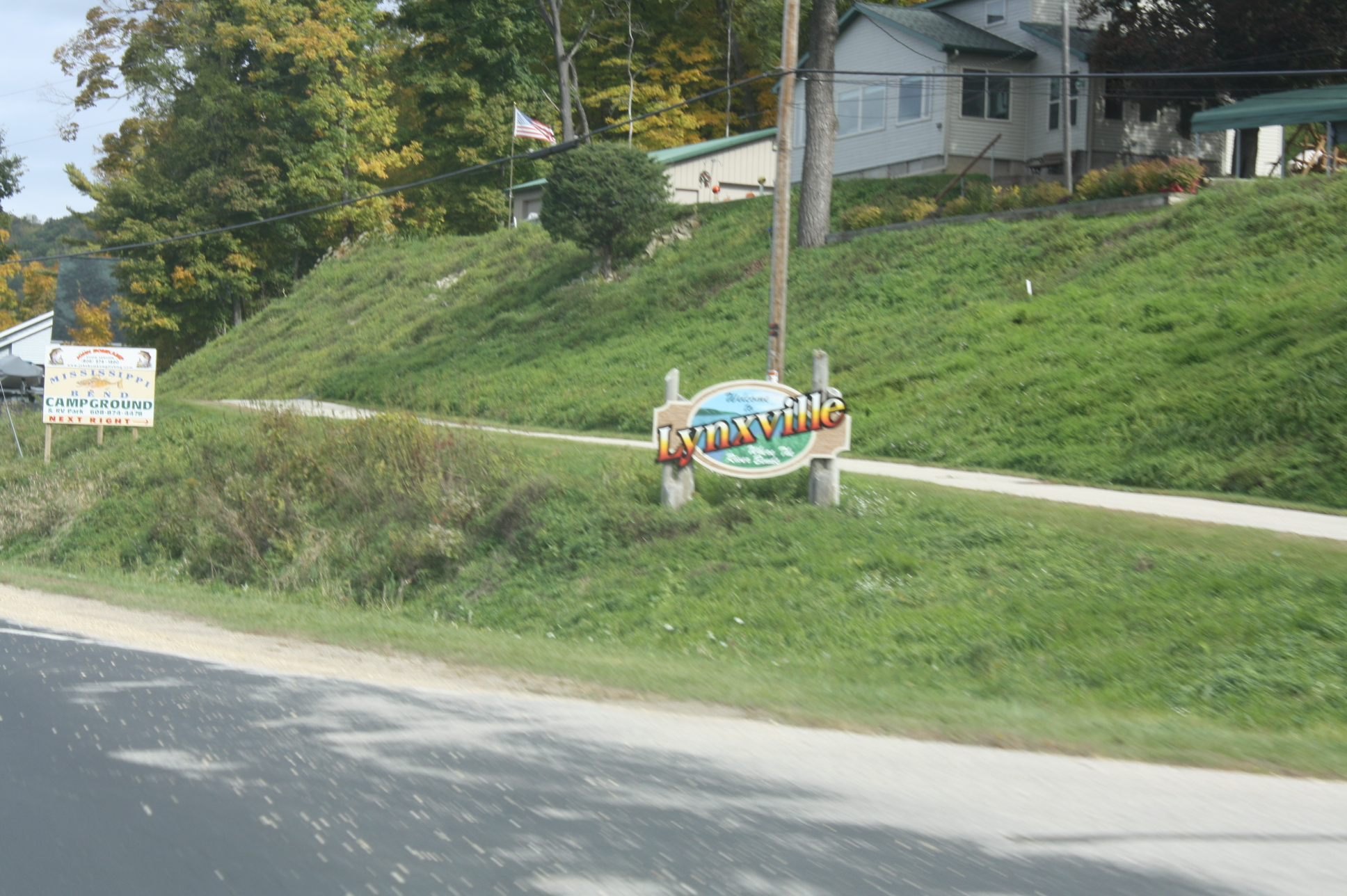
City welcome sign on WIS 35

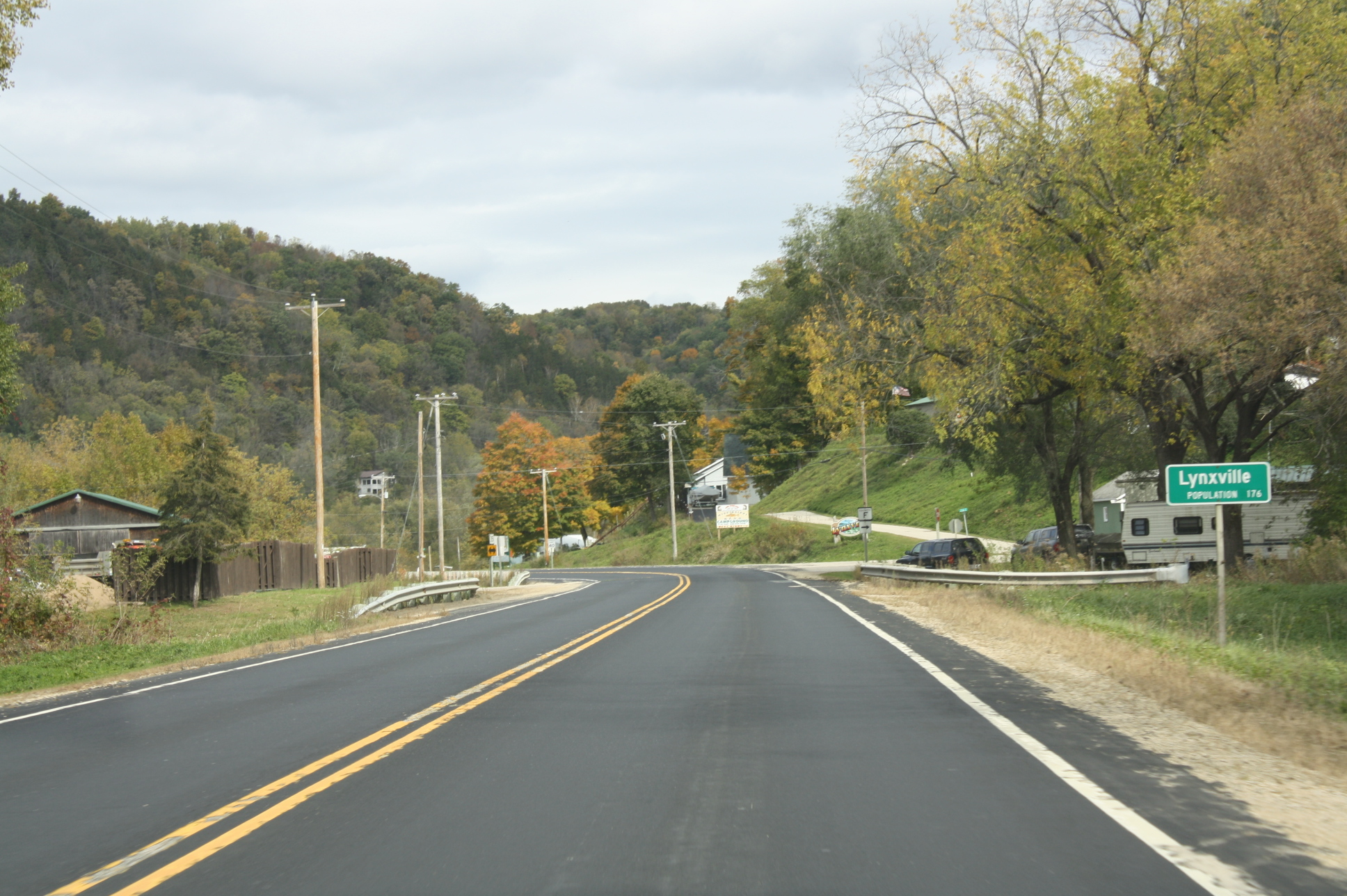
Welcome sign on WIS 35

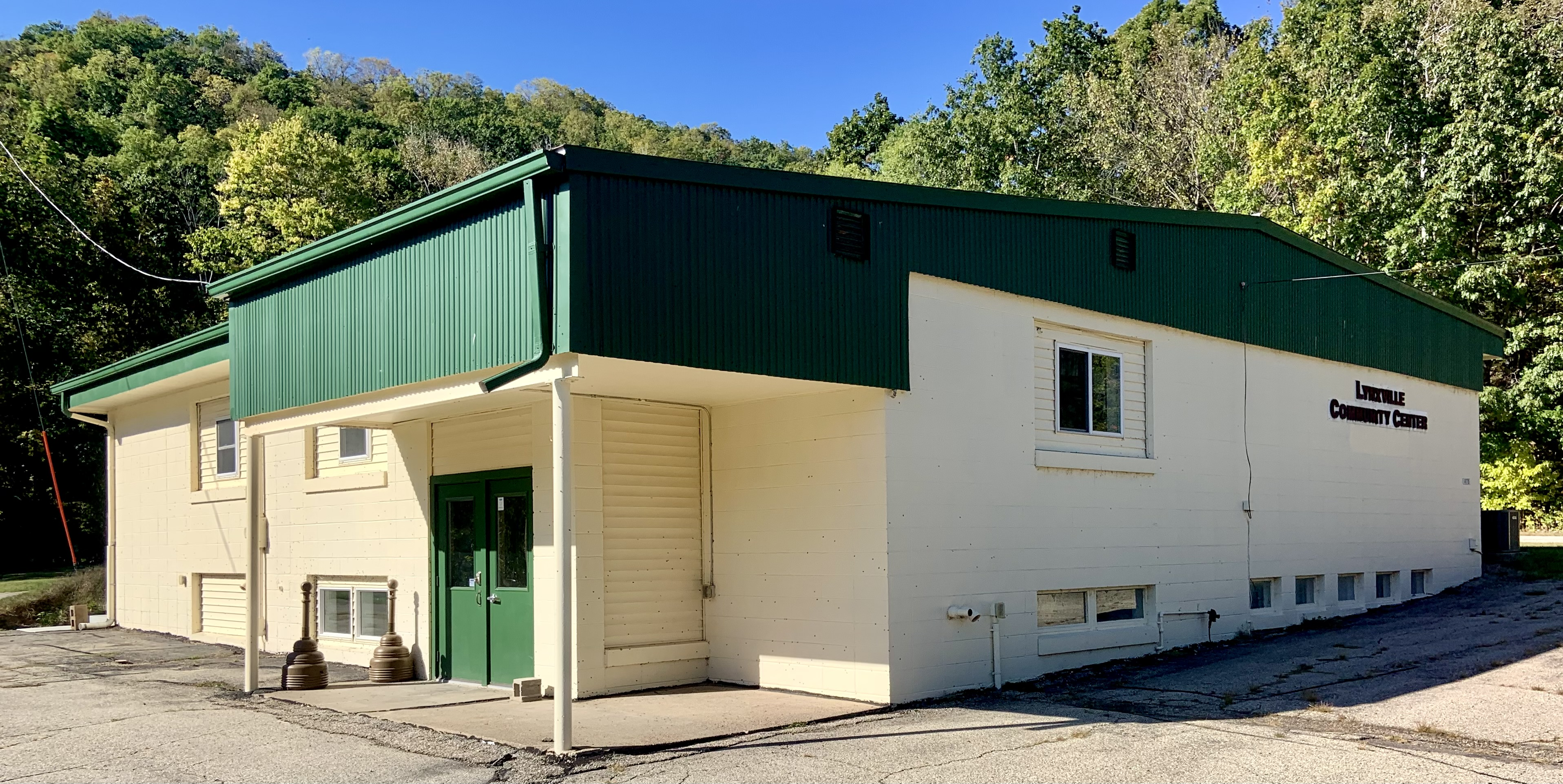
Lynxville Community Center
