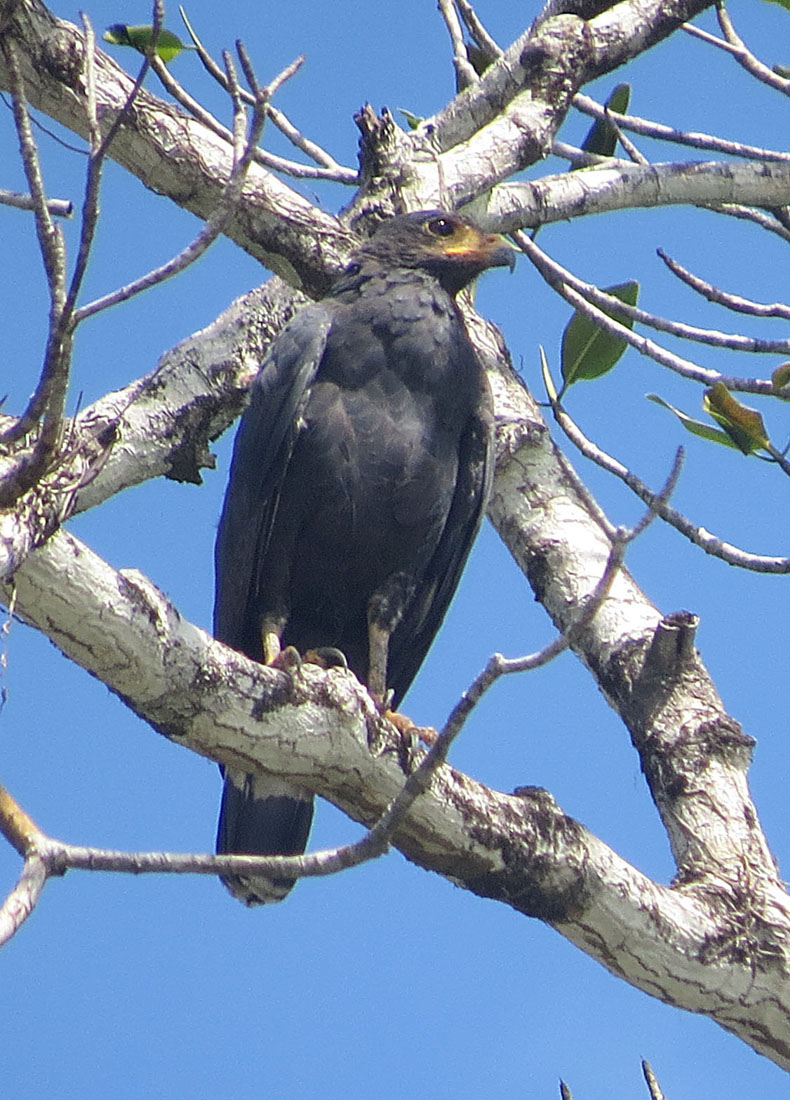

Scientific classification
- Kingdom: Animalia
- Phylum: Chordata
- Class: Aves
- Order: Accipitriformes
- Family: Accipitridae
- Genus: Buteogallus
- Species: B. anthracinus
- Subspecies: B. a. subtilis

Trinomial name
- Buteogallus anthracinus subtilis (Thayer & Bangs, 1905)

= Mangrove black hawk =

Subspecies of bird

The mangrove black hawk (Buteogallus anthracinus subtilis) is a neotropical bird of prey in the family Accipitridae native to South and Central America. Briefly treated as a distinct species, Buteogallus subtilis, recent evidence strongly suggests it should be considered a subspecies of the common black hawk (Buteogallus anthracinus).

== Range and habitat ==
The mangrove black hawk is a resident breeding bird from eastern Panama, through western Colombia and Ecuador, to far north-western Peru. Previously, it was incorrectly believed to occur as far north as Mexico, but all individuals from western Panama and northwards are nominate common black hawk.

This is a mainly coastal bird of Pacific mangrove swamps, estuaries and adjacent dry open woodland, which builds a large stick nest in a mangrove tree, and usually lays one dark-blotched whitish egg.

== Characteristics ==
The adult mangrove black hawk is 43–53 cm long and weighs around 930 g. It has very broad wings, and is mainly black with a brownish cast to the upper-wings. The short tail is black with a single broad white band and a white tip. The bill is black and the legs and cere are yellow.

Sexes are similar, but immature birds are dark brown above with spotting and streaks. Their underparts are buff to whitish with dark blotches, and the tail has a number of black and white bars.

The call of the mangrove black hawk is a distinctive piping spink-speenk-speenk-spink-spink-spink.

== Diet ==
The mangrove black hawk feeds mainly on crabs, but will also take small vertebrates and eggs. This species is often seen soaring, with occasional lazy flaps, and has a talon-touching aerial courtship display.
