= Columbia (1850 sidewheeler) =

1850 sidewheeler steamboat

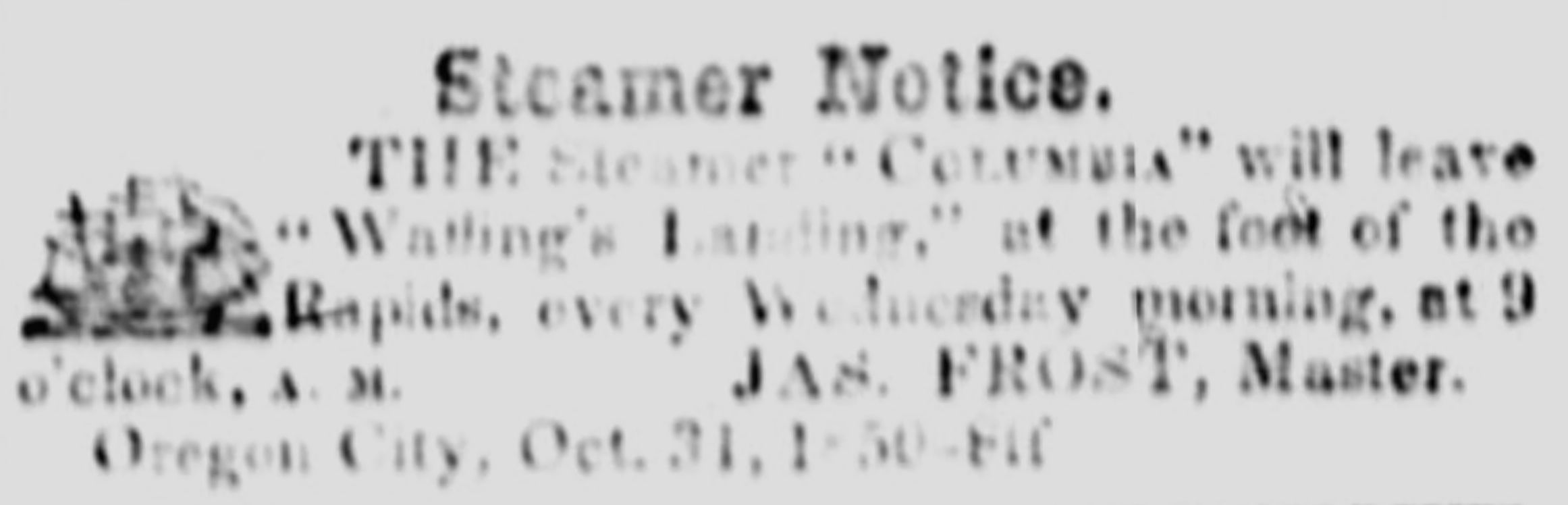
- Advertisement for steamer Columbia, July 17, 1851
- Name: Columbia (sidewheel steamboat)
- Owner: Frost, Adair, Leonards and Green
- Route: lower Columbia River and lower Willamette River
- Builder: Thomas Goodwin and George Hewitt
- Launched: 1850, at Astoria, Oregon
- Type: Shallow draft inland passenger/freight, wooden construction
- Length: 90 ft (27.4 m)
- Beam: 16 ft (4.9 m)
- Depth: About 4 ft (1.2 m) depth of hold
- Installed power: Steam engines, 8 in (20 cm) bore by 24 in (61 cm) stroke
- Propulsion: Sidewheels
- Speed: 4 mi (6.4 km) per hour or a little more
- Notes: Dismantled 1852, engines to sidewheeler Fashion

Columbia was a steamboat built at Astoria, Oregon in 1850. It was the first steamboat built in the Oregon Territory, and the first to establish regular service on the lower Columbia and Willamette rivers. This vessel should not be confused with the many other craft with the same or a similar name, including in particular at least four other vessels named Columbia which ran on the Columbia river or its tributaries.

== Owners ==
Columbia was built at upper Astoria, Oregon. One source states that the vessel was built by Gen. James Adair (1808–1888) and James Frost. John Adair was the first collector of customs for the Oregon Territory. Adair was a lawyer with political connections, and later was friend and advisor to Joseph Lane, one of Oregon's first senators. Frost, originally from Missouri, had come out to Oregon with a pioneer rifle regiment. He had been a sutler in this regiment, and his brother was quartermaster. When the American Civil War began, he returned to Missouri, where he served with the rebel militia. He lived in St. Louis, Missouri after the war. Another source states that Columbia was built by Thomas Goodwin and George Hewitt for Adair, Frost, and two others, whose names are given as Leonards and Green.

== Design ==
Columbia has been described as odd-shaped and clumsy-looking, and double-ended like a ferry. The vessel was built of wood and powered by sidewheels, which were driven by engines which originally came from France. James Frost had journeyed to San Francisco to purchase the engines, which were shipped up to Astoria. Another source states that the chief engineer, Thomas V. Smith, went to San Francisco to purchase engines.

== First trip upriver ==
It is to be regretted that there was no photo artist in those days to make a truthful picture of this poor sidewheeler as she struggled and panted against tide and current, doing her four or five miles an hour under favorable circumstances ... .

— Dan O'Neill, a captain of Columbia

Columbia began its first trip up the Columbia on the morning of July 3, 1850, with James Frost acting as captain. No one on board knew where the channel was, and the steamer's progress was slow. To act as pilots, Frost hired two young people of the Coast Salish who had been fishing on the river. By the end of the first day, they had travelled fifty miles, and Frost, not wanting to risk the vessel in the dark, tied up to the riverbank. The next morning, July 4, 1850, the steamer cast off again and proceeded upstream, arriving at Portland, Oregon (then only a small settlement) at 3:00 p.m. After staying at Portland for about two hours, Columbia then proceeded on to Oregon City, arriving there at 8:00 p.m., where there was a celebration of the vessel's arrival. It had taken 26 hours to make the trip.

== Later operations ==
Everything in connection with her was of the miniature order excepting the rates of fare. For the luxury of a trip from Astoria to Portland the modest sum of $25 was asked and cheerfully paid, a considerable difference to the present 'cut rates' of 25 cents, by boat or railroad cars. During the time I was thus employed quite a number who subsequently became millionaires were passengers, among them being H. W. Corbett, John Green, Henry Leonard and others; and also, at one time, a party of school marms who had come out from the East to teach school in Oregon.

— Dan O'Neill

After a second trip to Oregon City, Columbia began to run regular trips between Oregon City and Astoria, connecting with the ocean steamer coming up from San Francisco that was owned by the Pacific Mail Steamship Company. Columbia was "no floating palace". Fares were $25 per person either way, with passengers to furnish their own food, which would be eaten from baskets or on blankets spread out on the deck or a table in the small cabin. Space was allocated for sleeping at night on the deck, for which there was no additional charge. Often there was standing room only on the boat.

Once gold strikes began in the west, fares could be paid in gold. One early passenger, John McCracken, reported that he once paid two ounces of gold dust for travel on the Columbia from Astoria to Portland. He had to sleep on the upper deck, the vessel was crowded, and the trip took two days. The boat did not run at night. Columbia completed with the keelboats, bateaux and sailing vessels that had provided the transport on the river, by towing barges, transporting immigrants who had reached the Cascade Rapids and general steamboat work.

For six months Columbia was the only steamboat on the river, until the Lot Whitcomb was launched on December 25, 1850. Lot Whitcomb was a vessel far superior to Columbia. The owners of Columbia dropped their fare to $15. According to one source, Mills, the backers of Lot Whitcomb refused to meet this, believing, correctly, that people would pay more to ride their superior steamer. Another source, Corning, states that Lot Whitcomb forced the Columbia's fare down to $12.

== Disposition ==
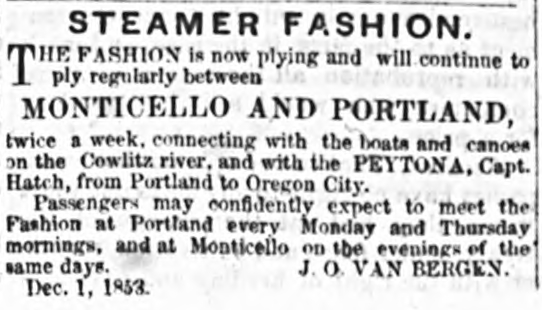
By December 1853, Fashion was running with Columbia's engines, as this advertisement shows.

The sources disagree as to the disposition of the vessel. Corning states that by June 1856, Columbia had made over 100 runs to Portland, and earned over $500,000 for her owners. Mills gives 1852 as the year in which the vessel was dismantled, as does the Lewis and Dryden Marine History. Sources agree, however, that the engines of Columbia were installed in the sidewheeler Fashion, which was built in 1853. After the engines had been removed, Columbia's hull was swept downstream and lost during a spring freshlet.
