= USS Black Hawk (1848) =

Gunboat of the United States Navy

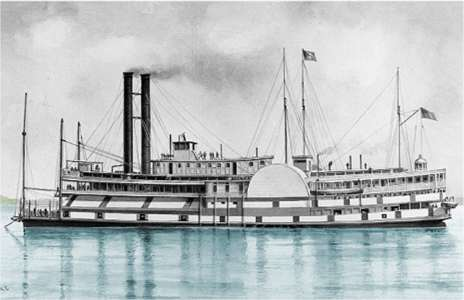
- USS Black Hawk

History

United States
- Launched: 1848
- Acquired: November 24, 1862
- Commissioned: December 6, 1862
- Out of service: April 22, 1865
- Fate: Sold, April 1867

General characteristics
- Displacement: 902 tons
- Length: 260 ft (79 m)
- Beam: 45 ft 6 in (13.87 m)
- Depth of hold: 8 ft (2.4 m)
- Propulsion: steam engine; side wheel-propelled
- Armament: 4 × 32-pounder smoothbores; 2 × 30-pounder rifled guns; 1 × 12-pounder rifled gun; 1 × 12-pounder smoothbore

USS Black Hawk was a large steamer purchased by the Union Navy during the American Civil War.

She was assigned by the Union Navy to gunboat duty in the waterways of the rebellious Confederate States of America.

== Service history ==
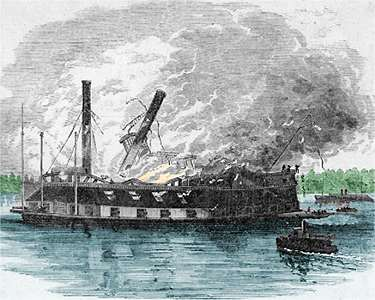
USS Black Hawk on fire off Cairo

Black Hawk, a side-wheel river steamer, was built in 1848 as Uncle Sam at New Albany, Indiana; purchased by the Navy at Cairo, Illinois, November 24, 1862, as New Uncle Sam; commissioned December 6, 1862, Lieutenant Commander K. R. Breese in command; and renamed Black Hawk December 13, 1862.

During most of her service Black Hawk served as flagship for Rear Admiral David Dixon Porter, Captain Alexander Mosely Pennock and Rear Admiral Samuel Phillips Lee, successive commanders of the Mississippi Squadron.

She participated in the Vicksburg campaign that began in December 1862. This included supporting Union forces at the Battle of Arkansas Post (also known as the Battle of Fort Hindman) on January 11, 1863. She next took part in operations off Haines Bluff from April 29 to May 2. The Vicksburg campaign culminated in the Siege of Vicksburg, which Black Hawk supported; the siege began on May 19 and lasted through July 4. The ship later participated in the Red River Expedition from March 12 to May 29, 1864.

Thereafter she patrolled in the Mississippi River and its tributaries. On April 22, 1865, she accidentally burned and sank, three miles above Cairo. Her wreck was raised and sold at St. Louis, Missouri, in April 1867.
