= Grasshopper buzzard =

Conservation status
- Least Concern (IUCN 3.1)

Scientific classification
- Kingdom: Animalia
- Phylum: Chordata
- Class: Aves
- Order: Accipitriformes
- Family: Accipitridae
- Genus: Butastur
- Species: B. rufipennis

Binomial name
- Butastur rufipennis (Sundevall, 1850)

Synonyms
- Buteo rufipennis Sundevall, 1850 protonym

Species of bird

The grasshopper buzzard (Butastur rufipennis), breeding in sub-Saharan Africa north of the equator.

== Taxonomy ==
The grasshopper buzzard forms a superspecies with the white-eyed buzzard (Butastur teesa), rufous-winged buzzard (Butastur liventer), and grey-faced buzzard (Butastur indicus) all of which occur in Asia.

== Description ==
The adult grasshopper buzzard is grey brown above with a darker head and dark shaft streaks on all of its feathers. The feathers of the mantle and lesser coverts are narrowly with fringed rufous in fresh plumage, although this wears off. The grey tail has faint brown bars. The greater coverts and primary feathers are light rufous, the primaries are tipped with black, and form a conspicuous reddish patch in flight. The secondary feathers are rufous shading to dark brown towards the tip, which is white. The chin and throat are whitish, with three black streaks on either side of throat. The breast is rufous and has narrow shaft streaks of black, the belly and thighs are also rufous but lack markings. The axillary feathers are greyish brown, spotted with white or buff. The under wing coverts and wing lining are white. The eyes, legs, and cere are yellow. The bill has a black tip and a yellow base. The female is slightly larger than the male. Juveniles have a bright brownish-red head and nape with dark shaft streaks, and as they age, the crown becomes the same colour as the back, the tail acquires bars, and the rufous edges on the mantle and coverts become less distinct. The length of the grasshopper buzzard is 30–35 cm (12–14 in); the wingspan: 90 cm (35 in) and the weight is 310–340 g (11–12 oz) for the males and 300–380 g (11–13 oz) for the females.

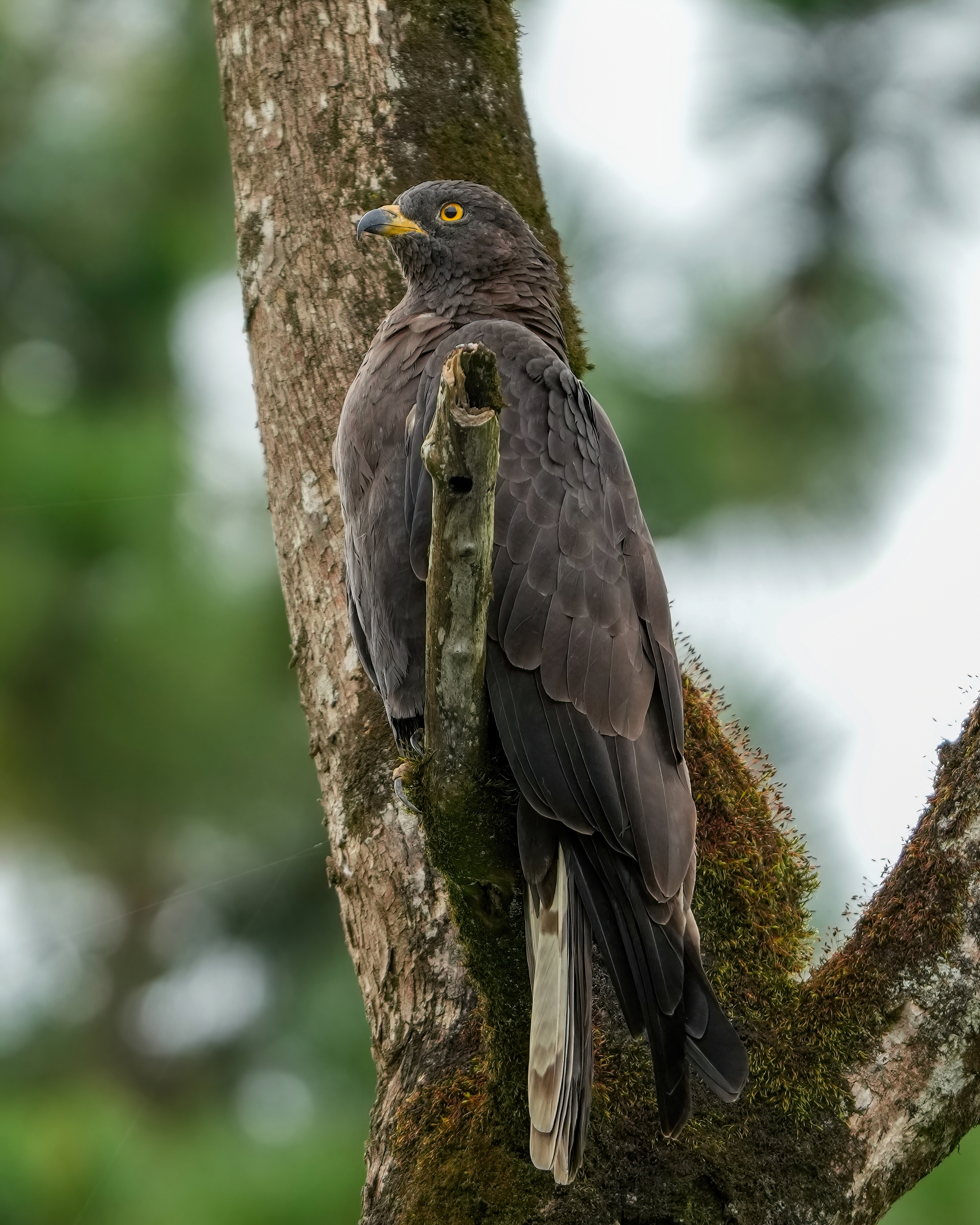
darker plumage, in Kibale Forest National Park, Uganda

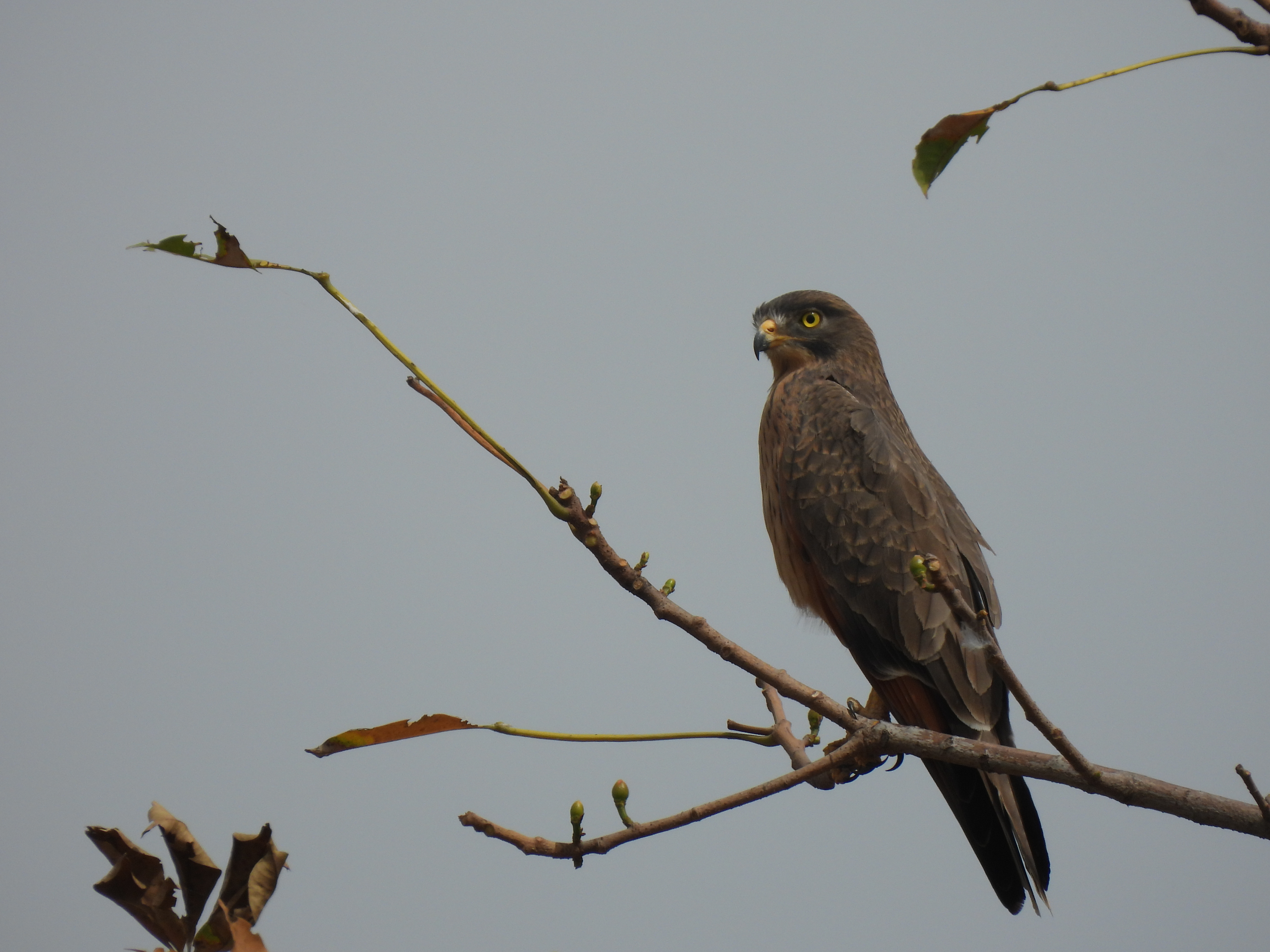
Grasshopper buzzard in The Gambia, West Africa

== Habitat ==
Grasshopper buzzards usually frequent woodland and forest edges, and arid acacia savannahs. It also can be found in marshes' edges and over burnt areas.

== Distribution ==
Afrotropical, mainly throughout the Sudan region : from Senegambia to Eritrea; wintering zone stretched from Sierra Leone to southern Somalia and Tanzania.

=== Movements ===
The grasshopper buzzard is a partial migrant which moves south in the dry northern winter, i.e. September to March, and north again in summer with the rains, April to September to breed. In general, this species ranges between about 9-15° N when breeding, south to 5° N in the dry season, it only occurs south of the equator in eastern Africa. There is much local and even annual variation in distribution and abundance.

== Biology ==
The grasshopper buzzard feeds mainly on insects although it will also take small birds, rodents and reptiles. It hunts from a low perch, looking for large insects, which are its main prey, catching them on the ground, or sometimes on the wing after a brief aerial chase. The grasshopper buzzard is quite sociable and is often seen in groups of 50 to 100 birds, most frequently in recently burnt areas where there are insect emergences. Grasshopper buzzards are specialists in catching grasshoppers during the non-breeding season; when breeding they consume a range of insects, mostly grasshoppers and beetles, also scorpions and sun spiders. The bulk of their breeding season diet is dominated by reptiles and other vertebrates: frogs, rodents, and birds are also regularly taken during this time.

Breeding season for grasshopper buzzards is between March and May in the northern part of the range, but laying depends on the region. The nest is placed in a fork of tree, in low tree, or sometimes at about 10 metres (33 ft) above the ground in taller trees. The nest is made with sticks, with a cup in the centre, lined with green leaves. One to three bluish-white eggs, with some dark markings, are laid. The details of the incubation and nesting behaviour are not known although fresh green leaves are added to the nest throughout the nesting period.

Grasshopper buzzards occur at quite high densities with up to 3.3 nests per square kilometre and with distances between nests of less than 100 metres (330 ft) in high-quality habitat. The home ranges overlap and birds regularly fly over neighboring territories on foraging flights.
