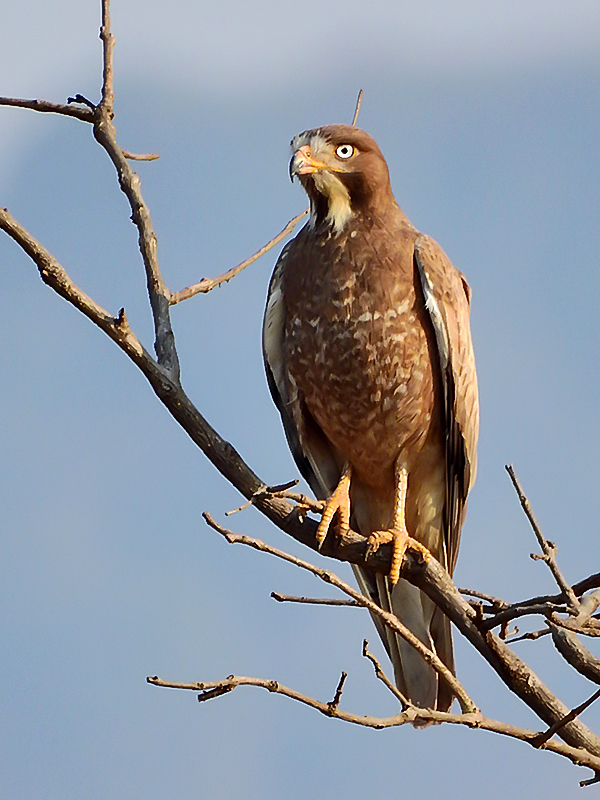
- Adult showing the typical throat, mesial stripe and pale iris, India

Conservation status
- Least Concern (IUCN 3.1)

Scientific classification
- Kingdom: Animalia
- Phylum: Chordata
- Class: Aves
- Order: Accipitriformes
- Family: Accipitridae
- Genus: Butastur
- Species: B. teesa

Binomial name
- Butastur teesa (Franklin, 1831)

Synonyms
- Poliornis teesa

= White-eyed buzzard =

Species of bird

The white-eyed buzzard (Butastur teesa) is a medium-sized hawk, distinct from the true buzzards in the genus Buteo, found in South Asia. Adults have a rufous tail, a distinctive white iris, and a white throat bearing a dark mesial stripe bordered. The head is brown and the median coverts of the upper wing are pale. They lack the typical carpal patches on the underside of the wings seen in true buzzards, but the entire wing lining appears dark in contrast to the flight feathers. They sit upright on perches for prolonged periods and soar on thermals in search of insect and small vertebrate prey. They are vociferous in the breeding season, and several birds may be heard calling as they soar together.

== Description ==
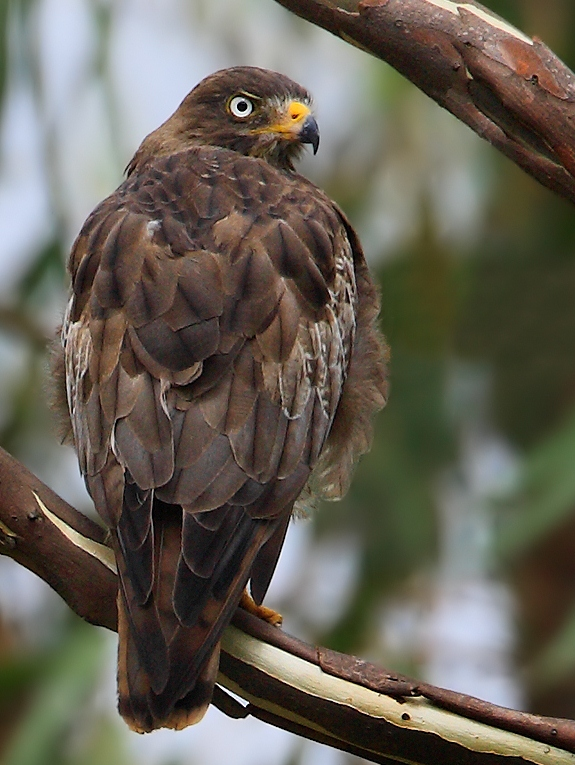
Adult, note the pale appearance to the median upperwing coverts

This slim and small hawk is easily identified by its white iris and the white throat and dark mesial stripe. A white spot is sometimes visible on the back of the head. When perched, the wing tip nearly reaches the tip of the tail. The ceres are distinctly yellow and the head is dark with the underside of the body darkly barred. In flight, the narrow wings appear rounded with black tips to the feathers and the wing lining appears dark. The upper wing in flight shows a pale bar over the brown. The rufous tail is barred with a darker subterminal band. Young birds have the iris brownish and the forehead is whitish and a broad supercilium may be present. The only confusion can occur in places where it overlaps with the grey-faced buzzard (Butastur indicus), adults of which have a distinctive white supercilium. Fledgelings are reddish brown, unlike most other downy raptor chicks, which tend to be white.

== Taxonomy and systematics ==
The specific name teesa is derived from the name in Hindi. The species was described on the basis of specimens collected by James Franklin who placed it in the genus Circus along with the harriers. The name Butastur was used to indicate that it appeared to be intermediate in characters to the Buteo buzzards and Astur, an old name for the sparrowhawks. Molecular phylogeny studies suggest that the genus is a sister group of Buteo and its relatives within the subfamily Buteoninae.

== Distribution and habitat ==
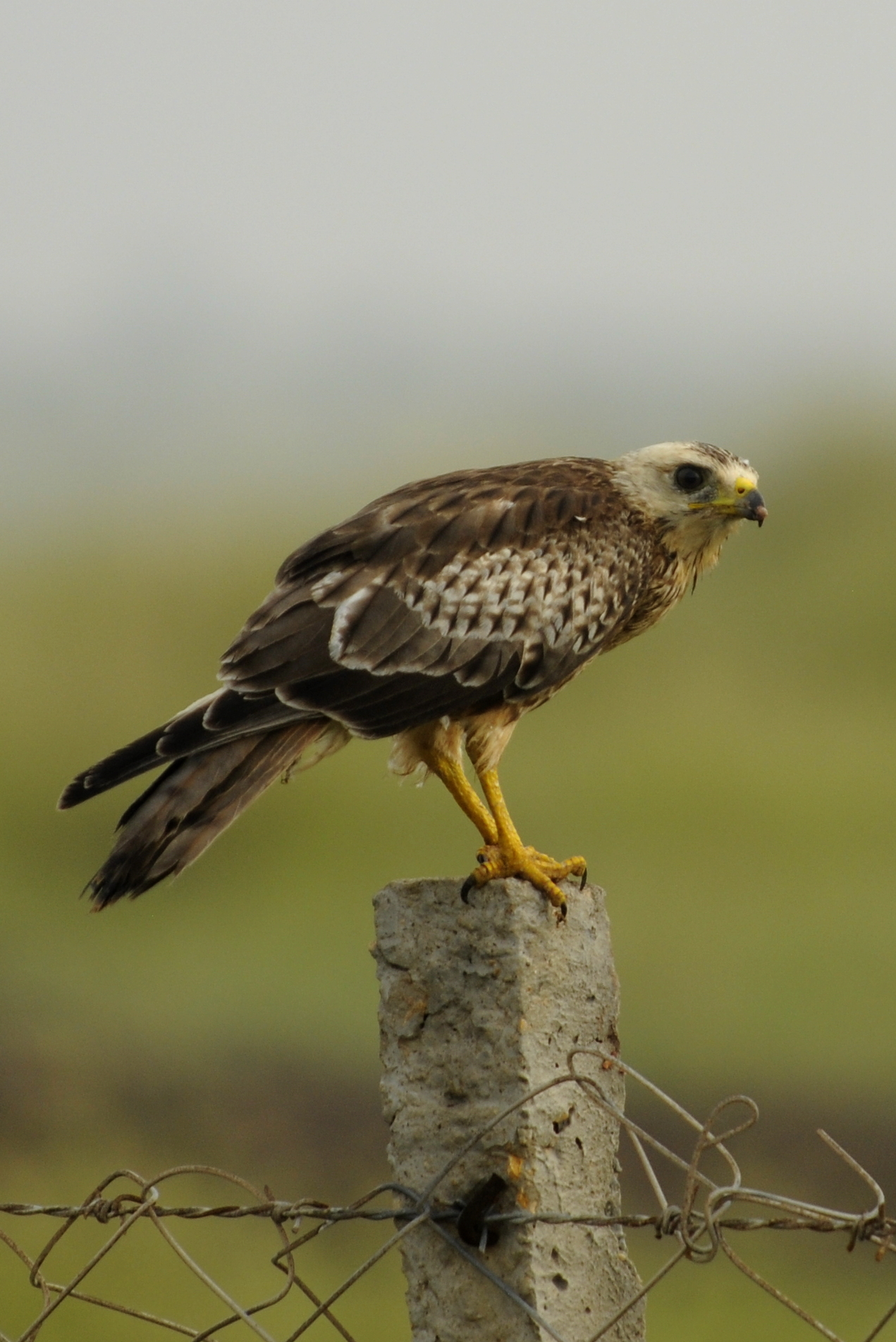
A young bird

This species is widely distributed in South Asia, throughout India in the plains and extending up to 1000 m in the Himalayas. It is a resident in Iran, Pakistan, Nepal, Bangladesh, and Myanmar. A form that is possibly of this species has been recorded in the Greater Sundas, Indonesia but this population is widely disjunct and has whiter and unmarked feathers on the thigh or "trousers" and vent, possibly representing a new form. It is absent from Sri Lanka and is probably absent from the Andamans. It is a summer visitor in northeastern Afghanistan. It is mainly found in the plains, but may go up to 1200 m altitude in the foothills of the Himalayas.

The usual habitat is in dry, open forest or cultivation. They are numerous in some areas, but declining. A survey in the late 1950s estimated about 5000 birds in the vicinity of Delhi in an area of about 50,000 km^{2} giving a density of 0.1 per square kilometre.

== Behaviour and ecology ==
This species is usually seen soaring alone in thermals or perched still. Groups of two or three may sometimes be seen. They have a mewing call or falling whistle (transcribed as pit-weer) that is repeated when pairs are soaring. They are vociferous in the breeding season.

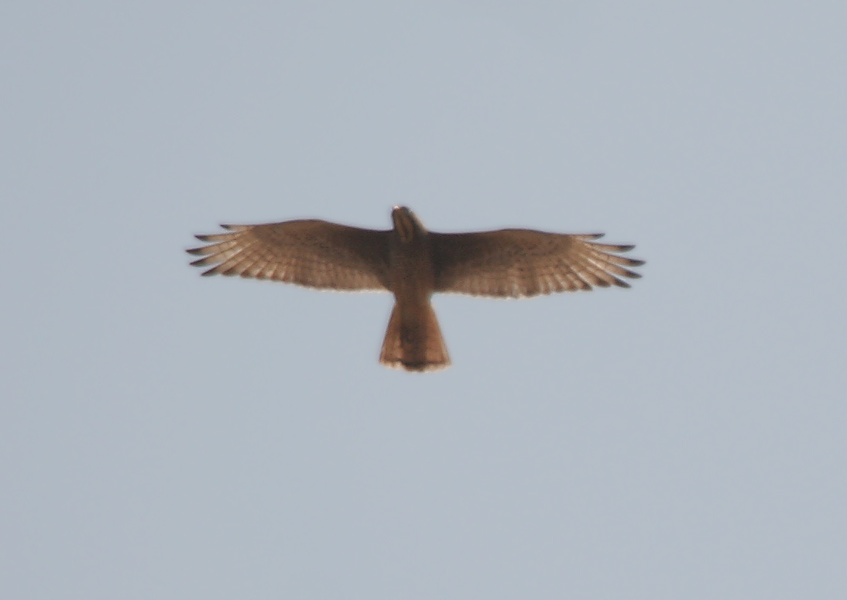
In flight, the dark wing lining and white throat are distinctive on the underside.

- - - - Butastur teesa
      - Butastur liventer
    - Butastur indicus
  - Butastur rufipennis
- - - - - - Buteo
          - Leucopternis
        - - Geranoaetus
          - Pseudastur
      - - Parabuteo
        - Rupornis
      - Morphnarchus
  - - - - - Buteogallus
          - Cryptoleucopteryx
        - Rostrhamus
      - Busarellus
    - - Ictinia
      - Geranospiza

Evolutionary relationship with Butastur species and other genera within the Buteoninae

They feed mainly on locusts, grasshoppers, crickets, and other large insects, as well as mice, lizards, and frogs. They may also take crabs from near wetlands and have been reported to take larger prey such as the black-naped hare (Lepus nigricollis).

The breeding season is February to May. The nest is loose platform of twigs not unlike that of a crow, sometimes placed in a leafless tree. The usual clutch is three eggs, which are white and usually unspotted. Both sexes share nest-building and feeding young; the female alone incubates for about 19 days until the eggs hatch.

A species of endoparasitic platyhelminth has been described from the liver of this species. A species of nematode, Contracaecum milvi, has been recorded in the liver and the stomach while Acanthocephalans, Mediorhynchus gibson and M. fatimae, has been described from the gut of specimens from Pakistan. Protozoa that live in the blood stream belonging to the genus Atoxoplasma have been isolated. Like most birds, they have specialized ectoparasitic bird lice such as Colpocephalum zerafae that are also known from other birds of prey. A study of power lines in Rajasthan in 2011 found white-eyed buzzards to be the second most common raptor killed by electrocution after kestrels.

== Gallery ==
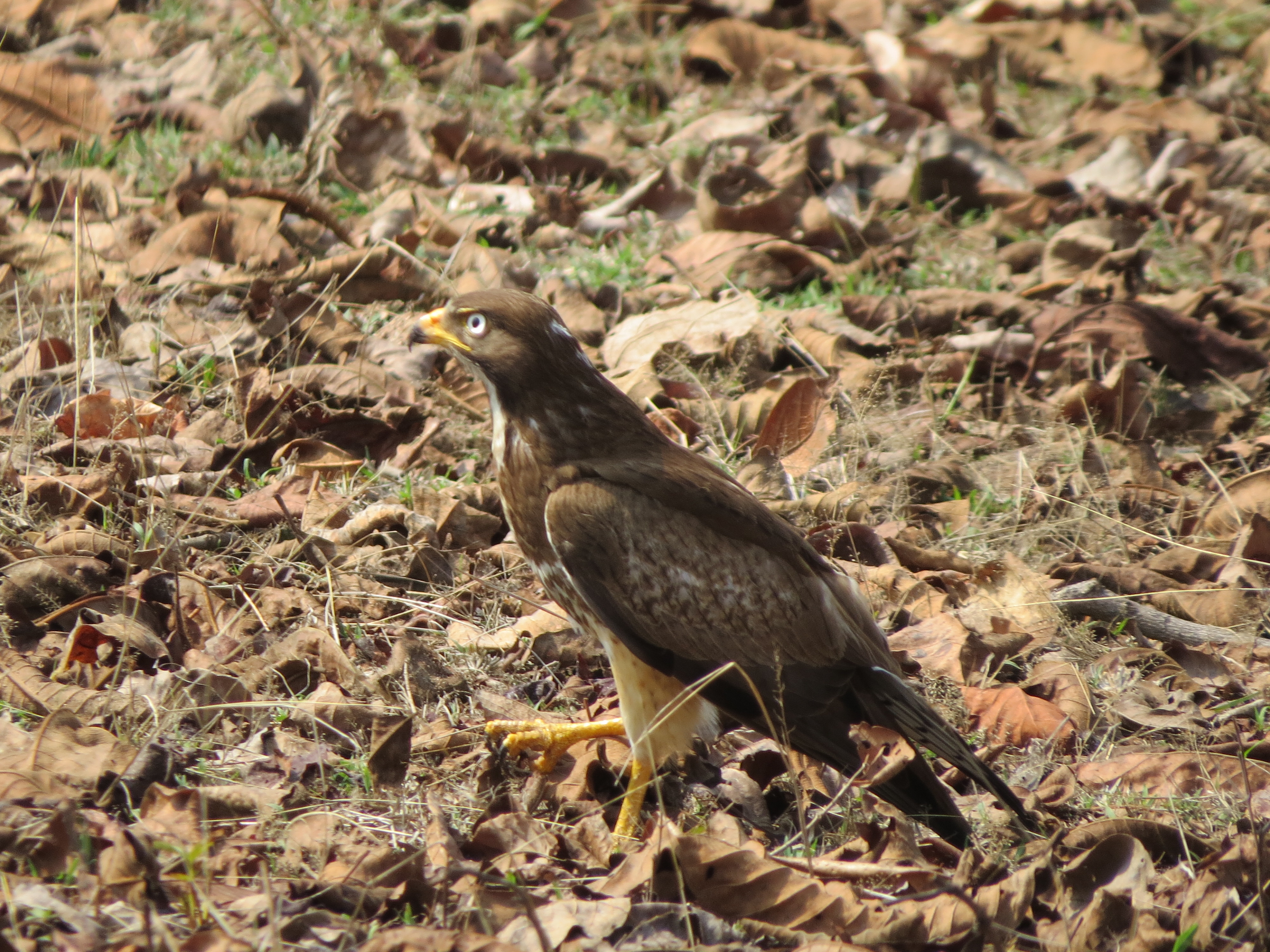

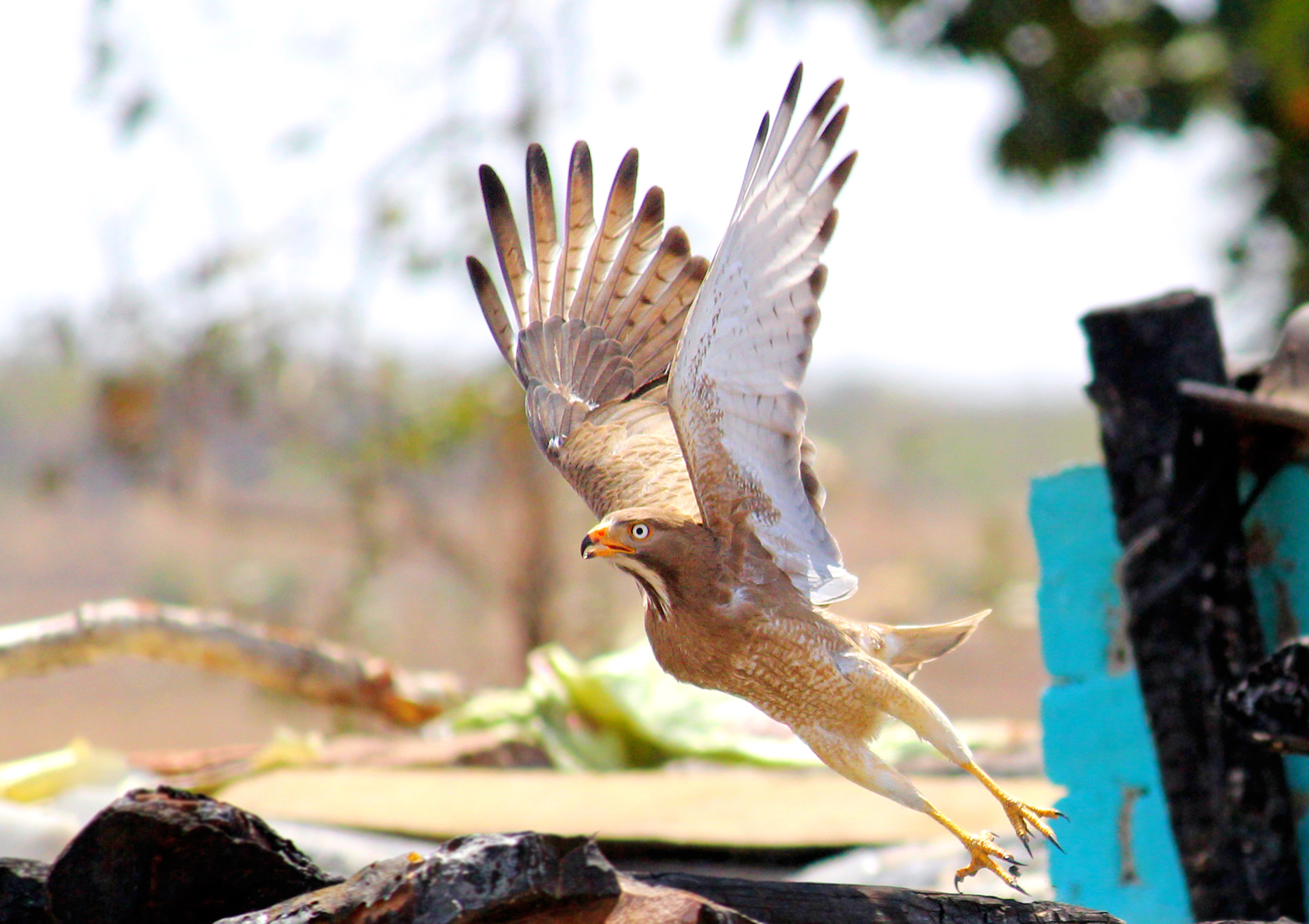
