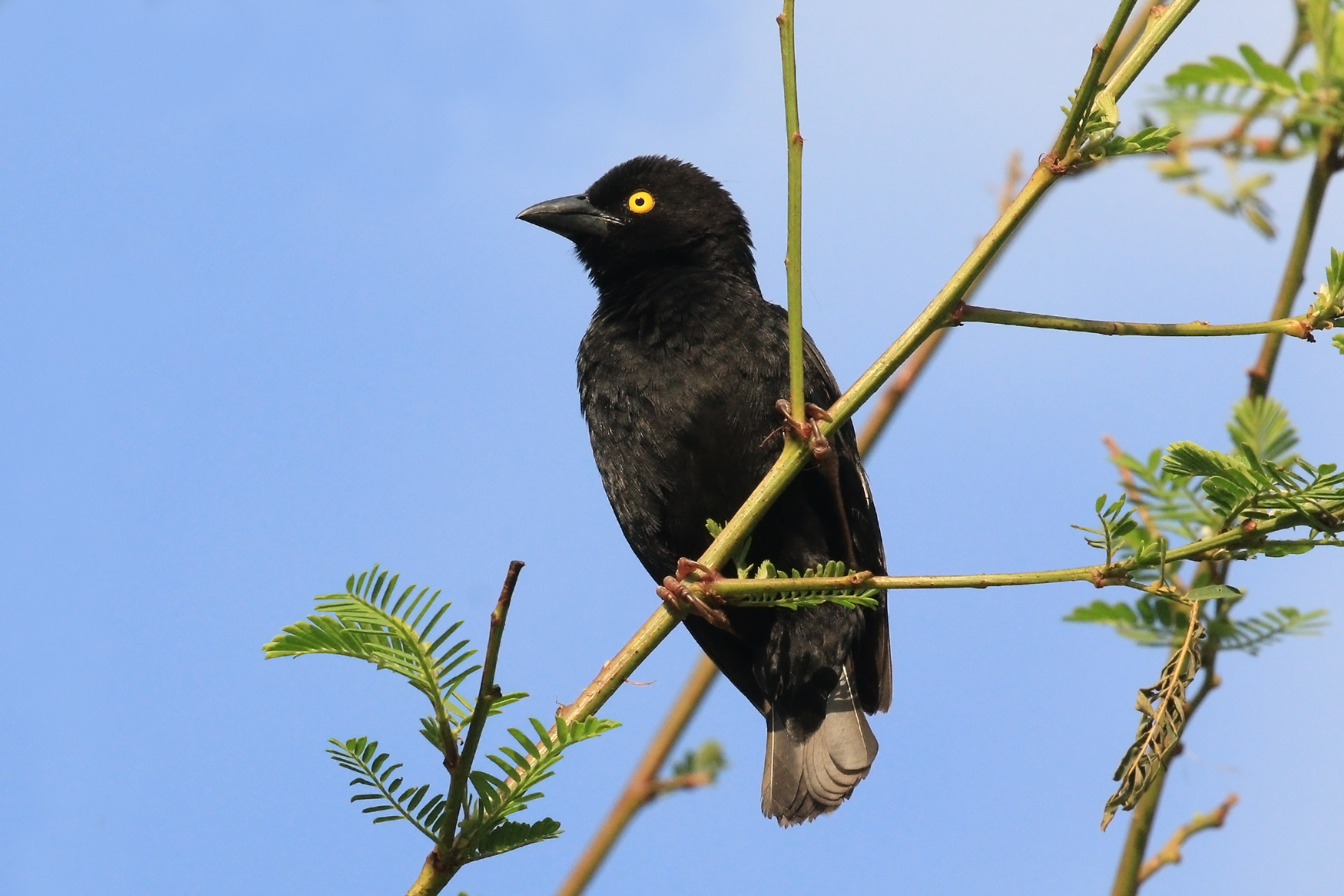
- Male in Uganda

Conservation status
- Least Concern (IUCN 3.1)

Scientific classification
- Kingdom: Animalia
- Phylum: Chordata
- Class: Aves
- Order: Passeriformes
- Family: Ploceidae
- Genus: Ploceus
- Species: P. nigerrimus

Binomial name
- Ploceus nigerrimus Vieillot, 1819

= Vieillot's black weaver =

Species of bird

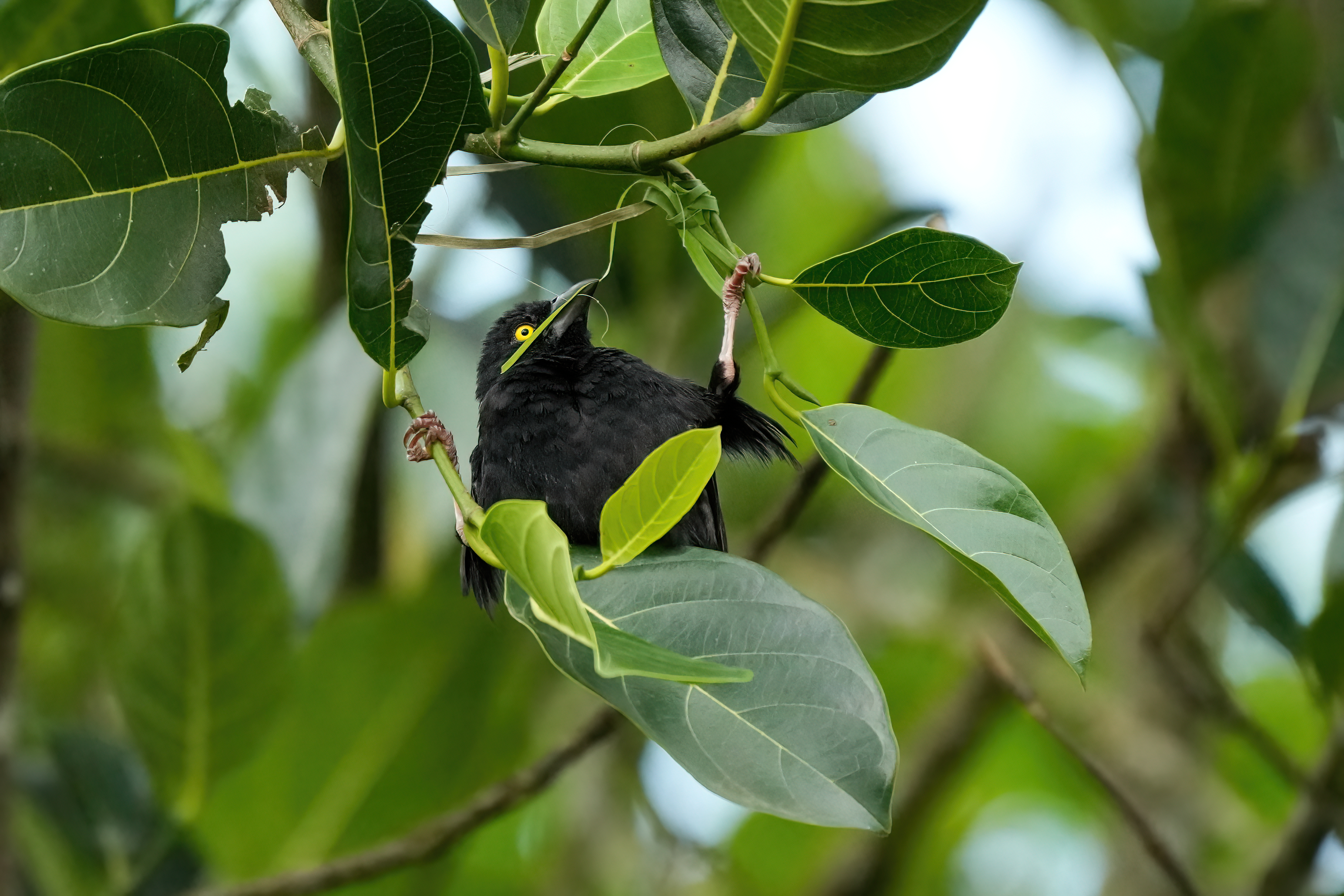
Vieillot's black weaver starting a nest at Kibale Forest National Park, Uganda

Vieillot's black weaver (Ploceus nigerrimus) is a species of bird in the family Ploceidae. It is found in southern Nigeria to Uganda, west Kenya, Angola and the Democratic Republic of the Congo. The common name is after the French ornithologist Louis Pierre Vieillot.

This species was formerly considered to be conspecific with chestnut-and-black weaver (Ploceus castaneofuscus). The species were split based on the striking differences in the colour of the plumage.
