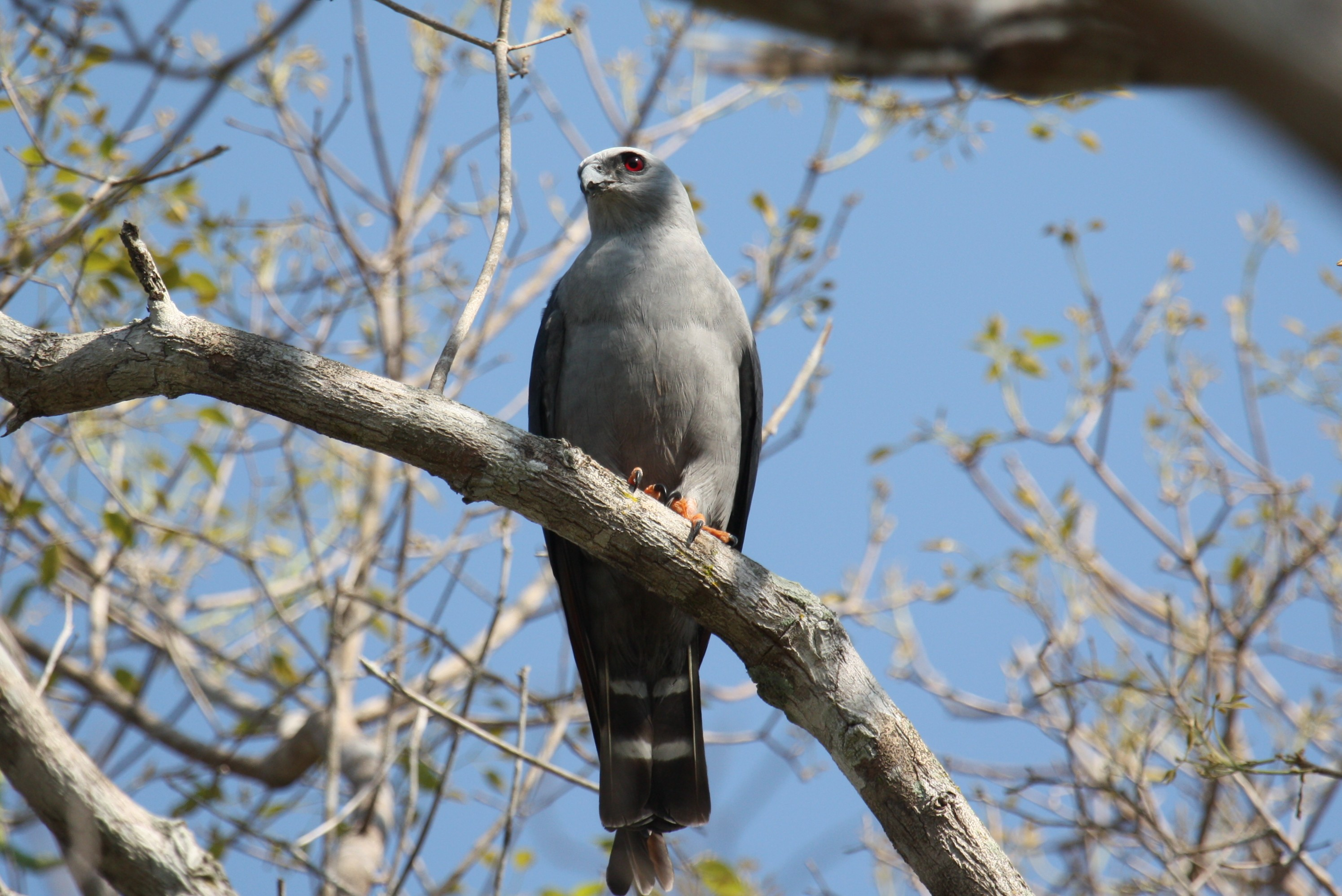
- In Mato Grosso do Sul, Brazil

Conservation status
- Least Concern (IUCN 3.1)

Scientific classification
- Kingdom: Animalia
- Phylum: Chordata
- Class: Aves
- Order: Accipitriformes
- Family: Accipitridae
- Genus: Ictinia
- Species: I. plumbea

Binomial name
- Ictinia plumbea (Gmelin, JF, 1788)
- Blue: Breeding; Green: Year-round; Purple: Migration

= Plumbeous kite =

Species of bird

The plumbeous kite (Ictinia plumbea) is a bird of prey in the family Accipitridae that is resident in much of northern South America. It is migratory in the northern part of its range which extends north to Mexico. It feeds on insects which it catches either from a perch or while in flight.

== Taxonomy ==
The plumbeous kite was formally described in 1788 by the German naturalist Johann Friedrich Gmelin in his revised and expanded edition of Carl Linnaeus's Systema Naturae. He placed it with the eagles, hawks and relatives in the genus Falco and coined the binomial name Falco plumbeus. Gmelin based his description on the "spotted-tailed hawk" that had been described in 1781 by the English ornithologist John Latham from a specimen from Cayenne in a private collection in London. It is now placed with the Mississippi kite in the genus Ictinia that was introduced in 1816 by the French ornithologist Louis Pierre Vieillot. The genus name is from the Ancient Greek iktinos for a kite. The specific epithet plumbea is from Latin plumbeus meaning "leaded", "plumbeous" or "lead-coloured". The species is monotypic: no subspecies are recognised.

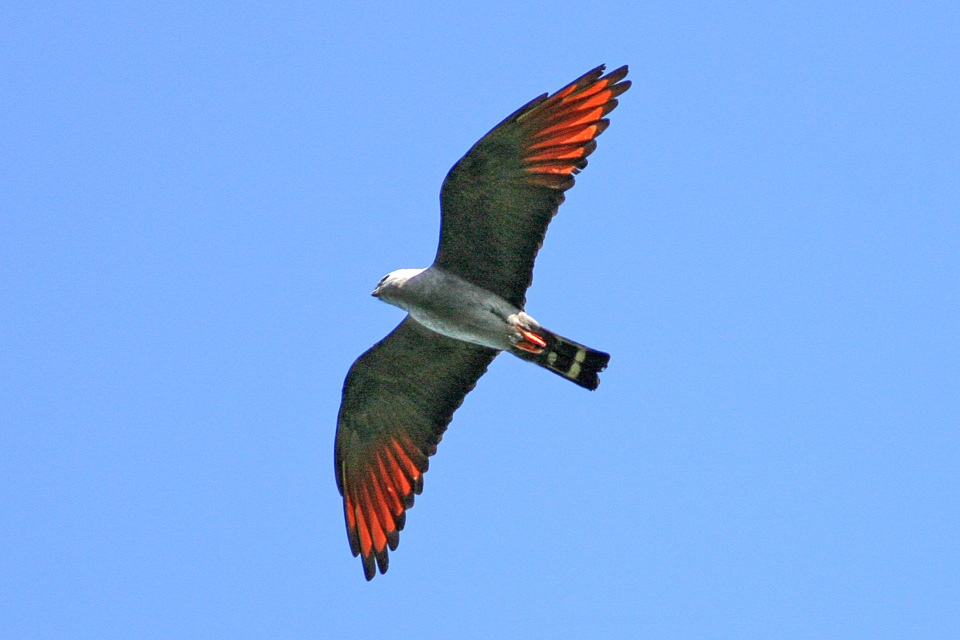
Plumbeous kite in flight

== Description ==
The plumbeous kite is 34–37.5 cm (13.4–14.8 in) in overall length. The male weighs 190–267 g (6.7–9.4 oz), the slightly larger female 232–280 g (8.2–9.9 oz). It has long, pointed wings. Adults are mainly slate-grey, with a paler head and underparts. The short black tail has 2-3 white bands on the undersurface. The eyes are red and the legs are orange. In flight, this kite shows a rufous primary patch. Sexes are similar, but immature birds have white-streaked grey upperparts and dark-streaked whitish underparts. They lack the rufous wing patch. The call of plumbeous kite is a whistled si-see-oo.

The plumbeous kite is darker gray overall than the strongly migratory Mississippi kite which has white patches on the secondaries and lacks the rufous patches on the primaries.

== Distribution and habitat ==
The plumbeous kite is a bird of lowland forest and savannah. It breeds in the Neotropical realm, from eastern Mexico to Peru, Bolivia and Argentina. It also breeds on Trinidad. Birds in the north and south of the breeding range, including the populations in Central America, Trinidad, Venezuela and Colombia, and southern Argentina and Brazil, are migratory, moving into tropical South America in the northern winter.

== Behavior and ecology ==
It is not particularly gregarious, although it is sometimes seen in flocks during migration.

=== Breeding ===
The deep stick nest is placed high in a tree, sometimes in a mangrove swamp over water. The clutch is usually a single egg but occasionally two eggs are laid. They are either white or very pale blue and measure about 41 mm × 35 mm (1.6 in × 1.4 in). The eggs are incubated for 32-33 days by both parents. The chicks are covered with white down and are fed by both parents. The young fledge when around a month of age.

=== Food and feeding ===
The plumbeous kite catches insects either in flight or from a perch. It will also occasionally prey on snails, frogs, lizards, bats, birds and snakes.
