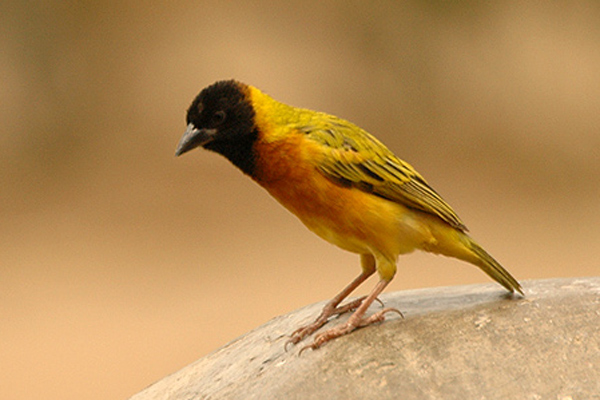
- breeding male

Conservation status
- Least Concern (IUCN 3.1)

Scientific classification
- Kingdom: Animalia
- Phylum: Chordata
- Class: Aves
- Order: Passeriformes
- Family: Ploceidae
- Genus: Ploceus
- Species: P. melanocephalus

Binomial name
- Ploceus melanocephalus (Linnaeus, 1758)

Synonyms
- Loxia melanocephala Linnaeus, 1758

= Black-headed weaver =

Black-backed weaver

Species of bird

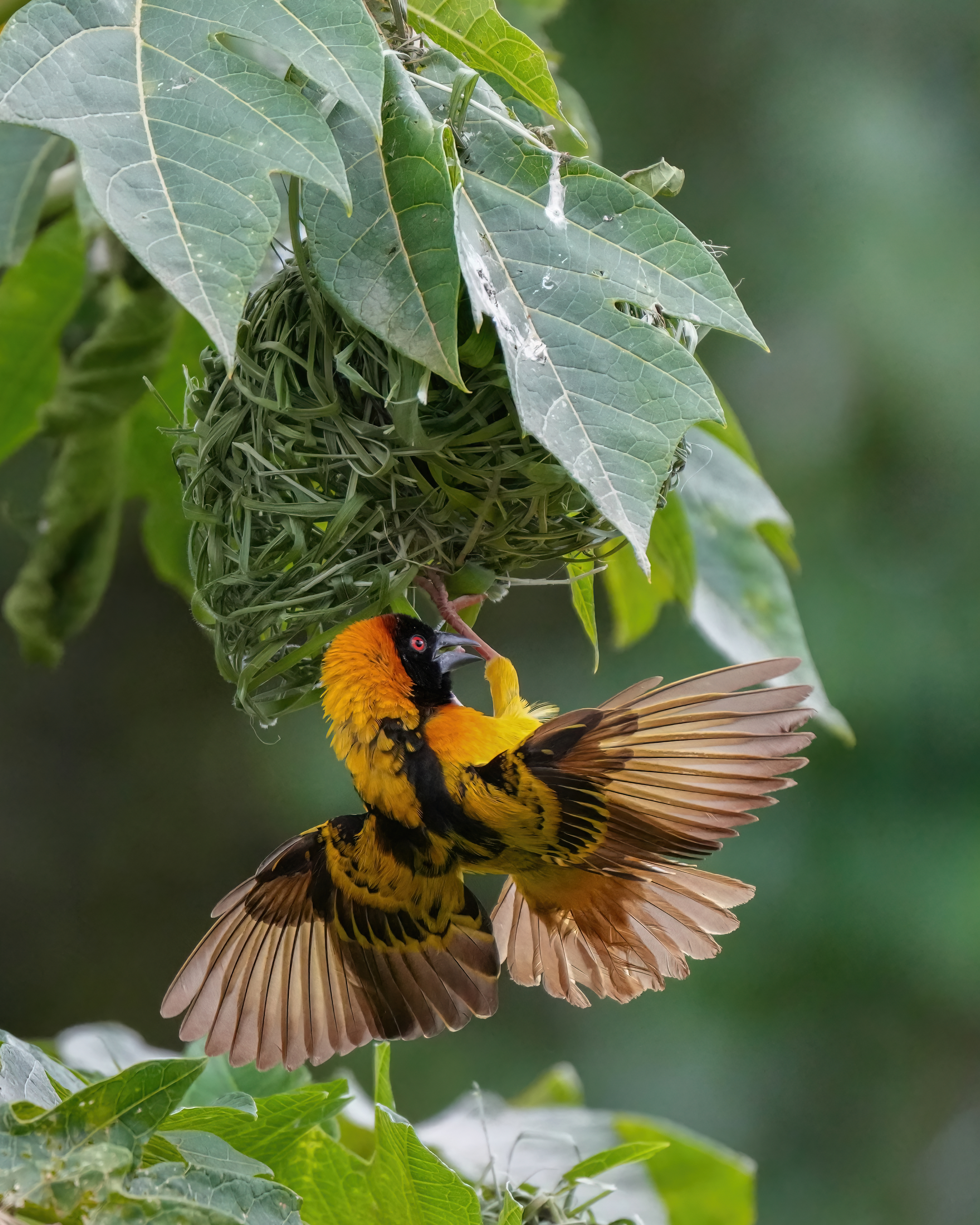
Black-headed weaver building its nest at Kibale Forest National Park

The black-headed weaver (Ploceus melanocephalus), also known as yellow-backed weaver, is a species of bird in the family Ploceidae. It is a resident breeder in damp areas in tropical Africa.

== Taxonomy ==
The black-headed weaver was formally described in 1758 by the Swedish naturalist Carl Linnaeus in the tenth edition of his Systema Naturae under the binomial name Loxia melanocephala. He specified the type locality as Guinea. Linnaeus based his account on the "Gamboa Groasbeak" that had been described and illustrated in 1750 by the English naturalist Eleazar Albin in his book A Natural History of Birds. Albin had sketched a live specimen belonging to the Duke of Chandos at his country house, Cannons, which was located about 11 mi (18 km) northwest of London near Edgware. The specific epithet melanocephalus, melanocephala combines the Ancient Greek μελας/melas, μελανος/melanos meaning "black" with -κεφαλος/-kephalos meaning "-headed". The black-headed weaver is now one of 67 species placed in the genus Ploceus that was introduced in 1816 by the French naturalist Georges Cuvier.

Five subspecies are recognised:

- P. m. melanocephalus (Linnaeus, 1758) – Mauritania, Senegal, Gambia, Mali and Niger
- P. m. capitalis (Latham, 1790) – Guinea Bissau to Nigeria, north Cameroon, southwest Chad and north Central African Republic
- P. m. duboisi Hartlaub, 1886 – east Congo, south Central African Republic and southwest Sudan to north Zambia
- P. m. dimidiatus (Salvadori & Antinori, 1873) – northeast Sudan and west Eritrea
- P. m. fischeri Reichenow, 1887 – east DR Congo, Uganda, west Kenya, northwest Tanzania and north Zambia

P. victoriae Ash, 1986 is now thought to be a hybrid between P. melanocephalus and P. castanops.

== Description ==
Breeding males have a black head and yellow nuchal collar, which is absent in the Juba and golden-backed weavers. It also differs from the latter species and village weaver by its plain, greenish mantle plumage. The pale yellow underpart plumage is suffused with a variable amount of chestnut.

The female and non-breeding male lack the black head, and resemble a female masked weaver, except that they have dark eyes and a darker bill. Their buffy breast plumage also distinguishes them from non-breeding golden-backed weavers.

== Distribution and habitat ==
It is found in West, Central, and East Africa, but it has also been introduced to the Iberian Peninsula. It is found in savanna and similar habitats, typically near water. It often lives on an Acacia tree 3 meter away from land to prevent predation.

== Gallery ==
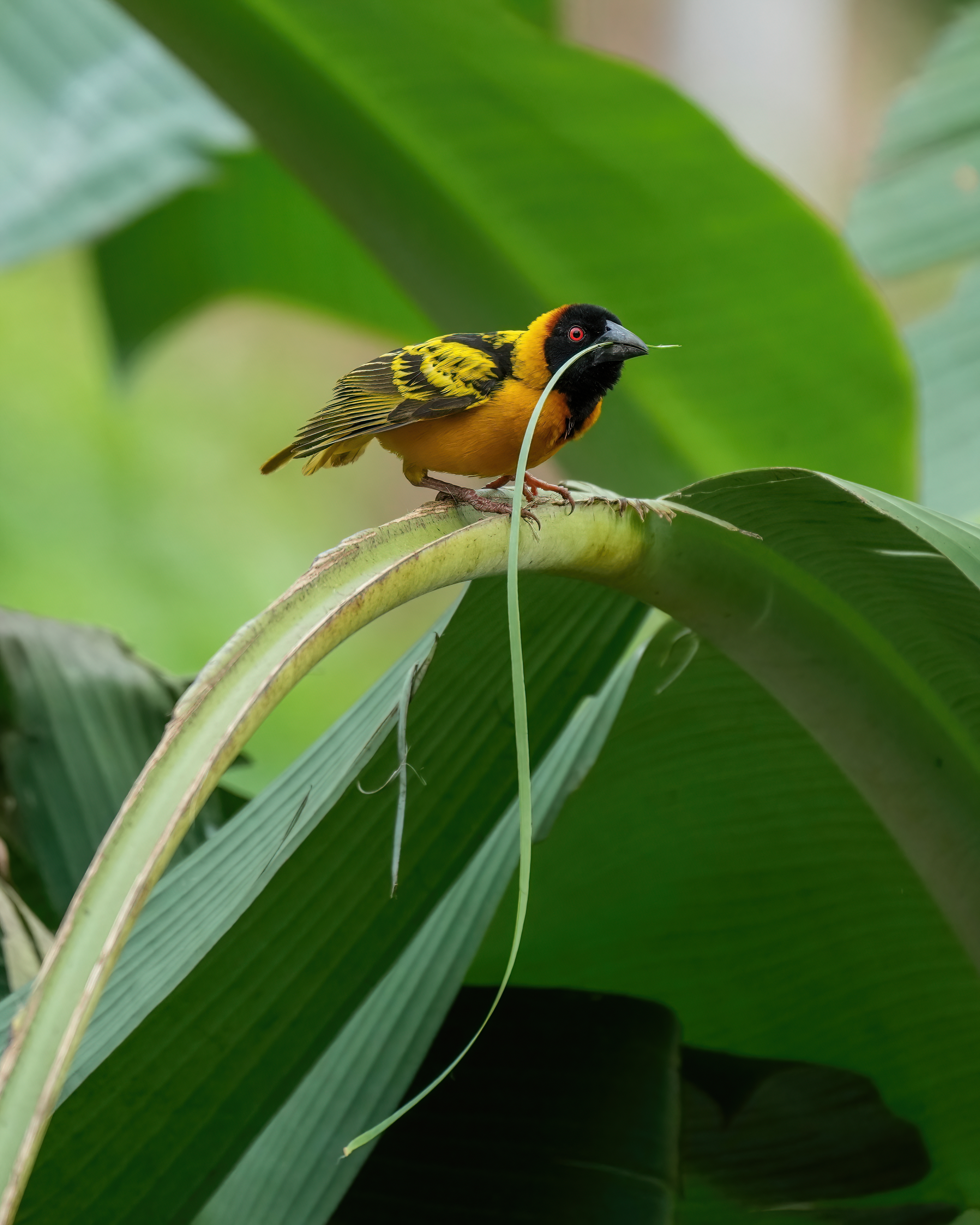
Black-headed weaver gathering nest material

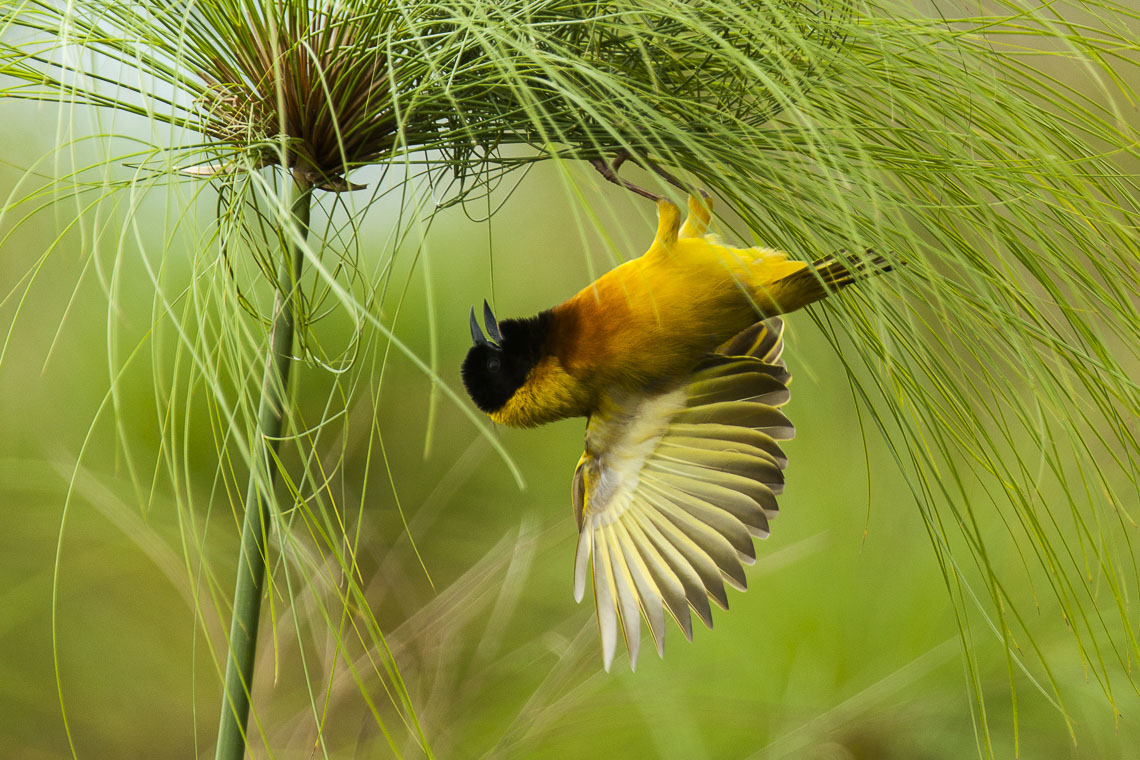
Male displaying in papyrus marsh

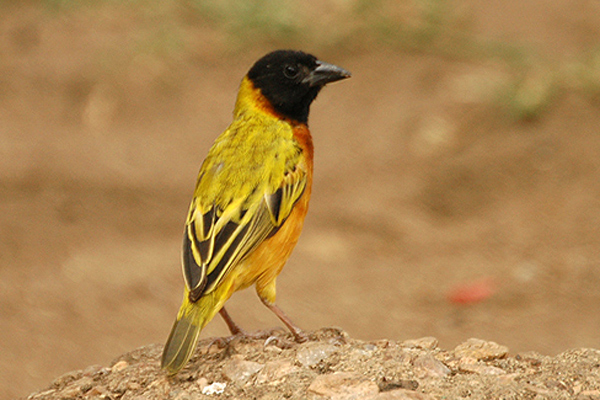
Male bird in Queen Elizabeth N.P., Uganda

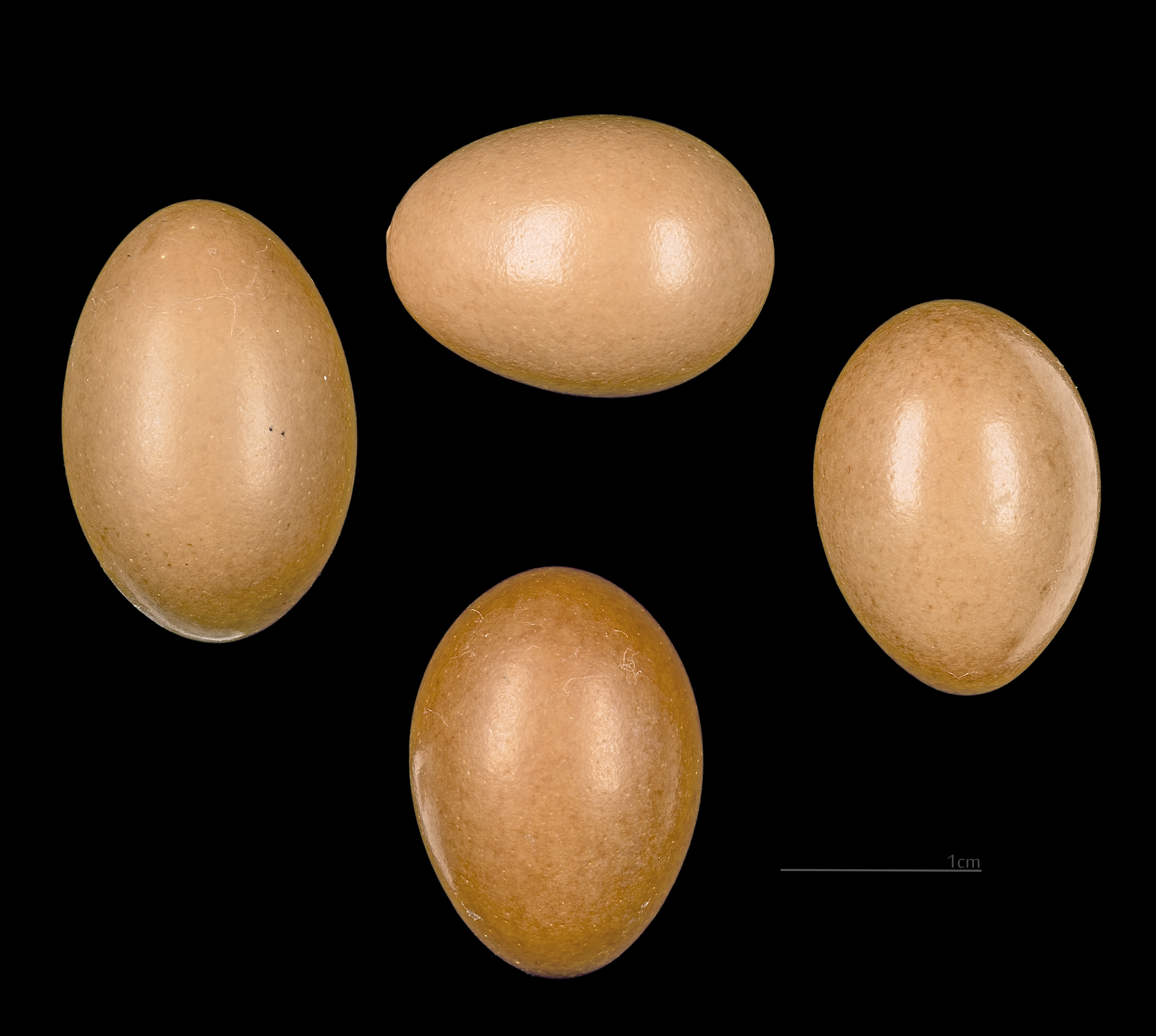
Clutch of eggs from Senegal (MHNT)

Media related to Ploceus melanocephalus at Wikimedia Commons
