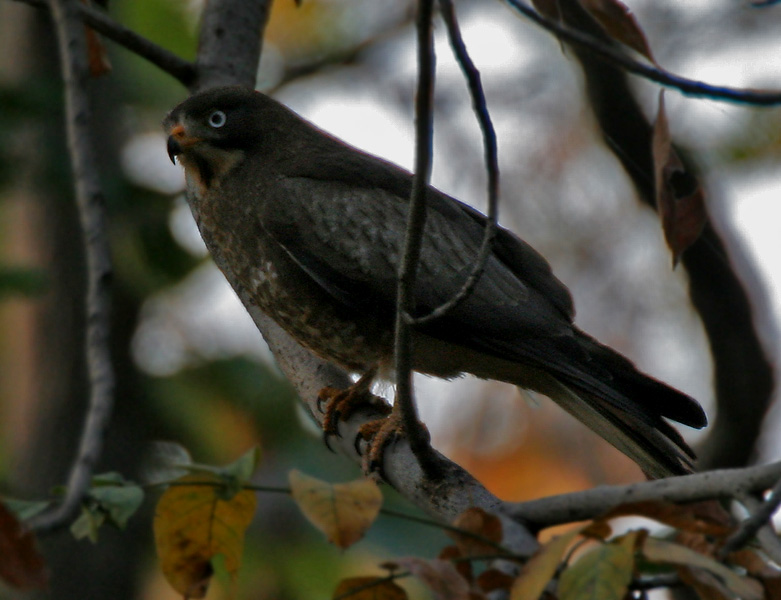
- in Kawal Wildlife Sanctuary, India.

Scientific classification
- Domain: Eukaryota
- Kingdom: Animalia
- Phylum: Chordata
- Class: Aves
- Order: Accipitriformes
- Family: Accipitridae
- Subfamily: Buteoninae
- Genus: Butastur; Hodgson, 1843

Type species
- Circus teesa Franklin, 1831

= Butastur =

Genus of birds

Butastur is a genus of birds of prey in the family Accipitridae.

== Taxonomy and species ==
The genus Butastur was introduced in 1843 by the English naturalist Brian Houghton Hodgson with the white-eyed buzzard as the type species. The genus name is a portmanteau of the genus Buteo introduced by Bernard Germain de Lacépède for the buzzards and Astur introduced by Lacépède for the goshawks. The genus now contains four species.

Genus Butastur – Hodgson, 1843 – four species
Common name	Scientific name and subspecies	Range	Size and ecology	IUCN status and estimated population
Rufous-winged buzzard	Butastur liventer (Temminck, 1827)	southern China, Myanmar, Thailand, Cambodia, Laos, Vietnam and Indonesia.	Size: Habitat: Diet:	LC
Grasshopper buzzard	Butastur rufipennis (Sundevall, 1850)	Senegal and Gambia east to Ethiopia, migrating south to Sierra Leone, Cameroon, northeastern Democratic Republic of Congo, Kenya, and northern Tanzania	Size: Habitat: Diet:	LC
White-eyed buzzard	Butastur teesa (Franklin, 1831)	Iran, Pakistan, Nepal, Bangladesh and Myanmar	Size: Habitat: Diet:	LC
Grey-faced buzzard	Butastur indicus (Gmelin, JF, 1788)	Russia, North China, Korea, Japan, and Philippines	Size: Habitat: Diet:	LC
