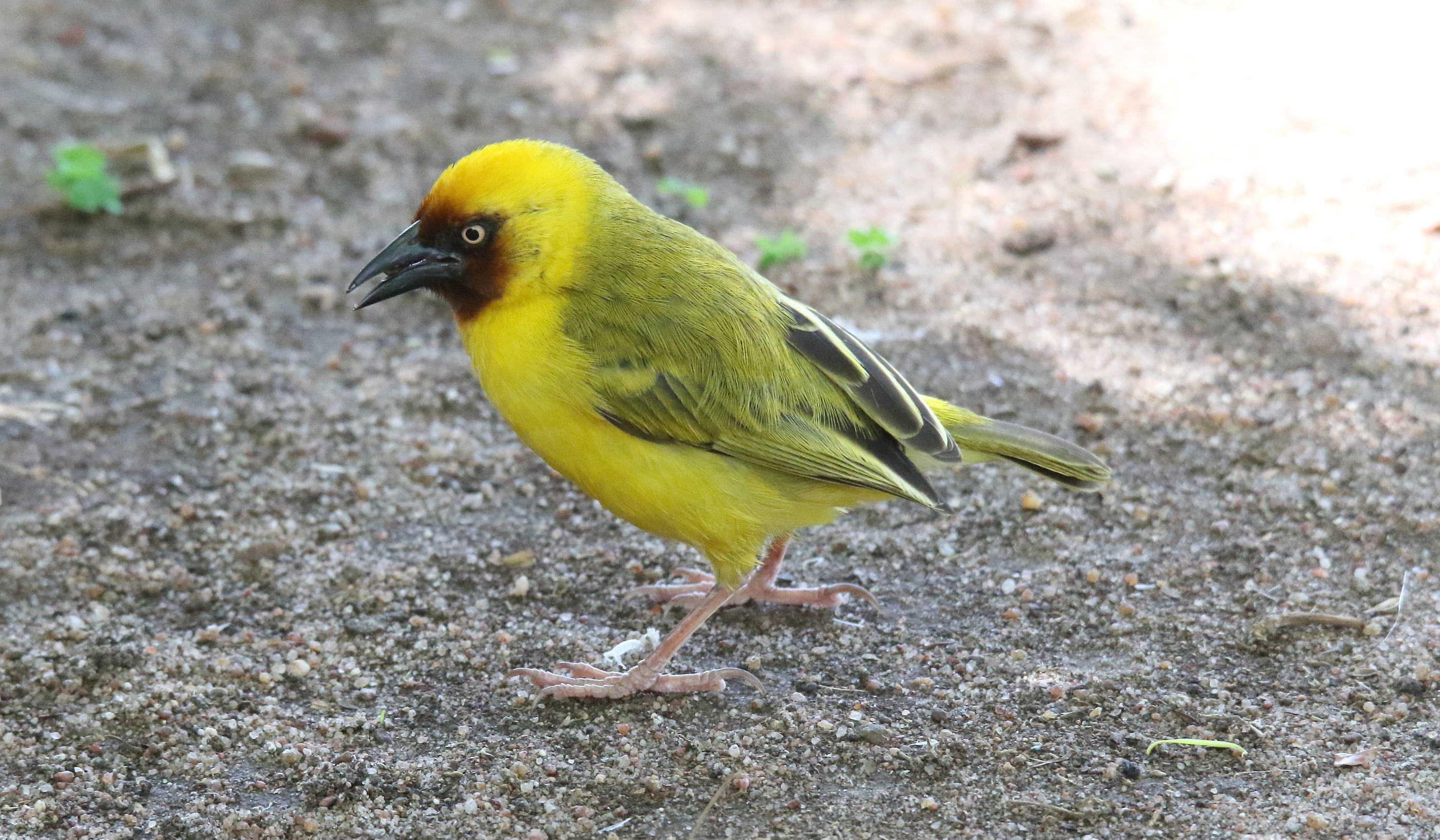

Conservation status
- Least Concern (IUCN 3.1)

Scientific classification
- Kingdom: Animalia
- Phylum: Chordata
- Class: Aves
- Order: Passeriformes
- Family: Ploceidae
- Genus: Ploceus
- Species: P. castanops

Binomial name
- Ploceus castanops Shelley, 1888

= Northern brown-throated weaver =

Species of bird

The northern brown-throated weaver (Ploceus castanops) is a species of bird in the family Ploceidae. It is found in Uganda, Rwanda and adjacent northern Burundi, eastern Democratic Republic of the Congo, western Kenya and northwestern Tanzania.

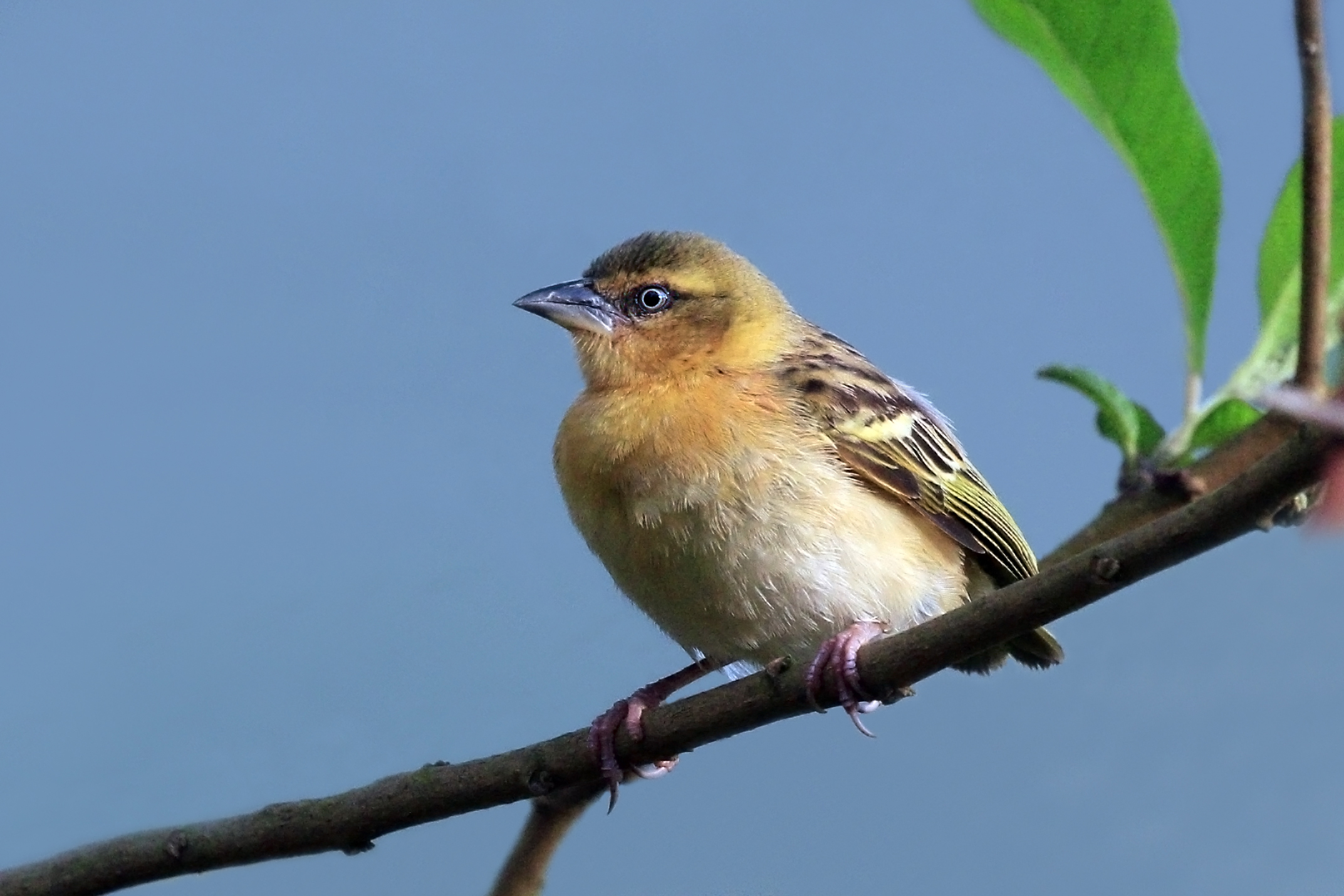
Female Lake Bunyonyi, Uganda

== Hybridisation ==
P. victoriae (Ash, 1986) is now thought to be a hybrid between P. castanops and P. melanocephalus.
