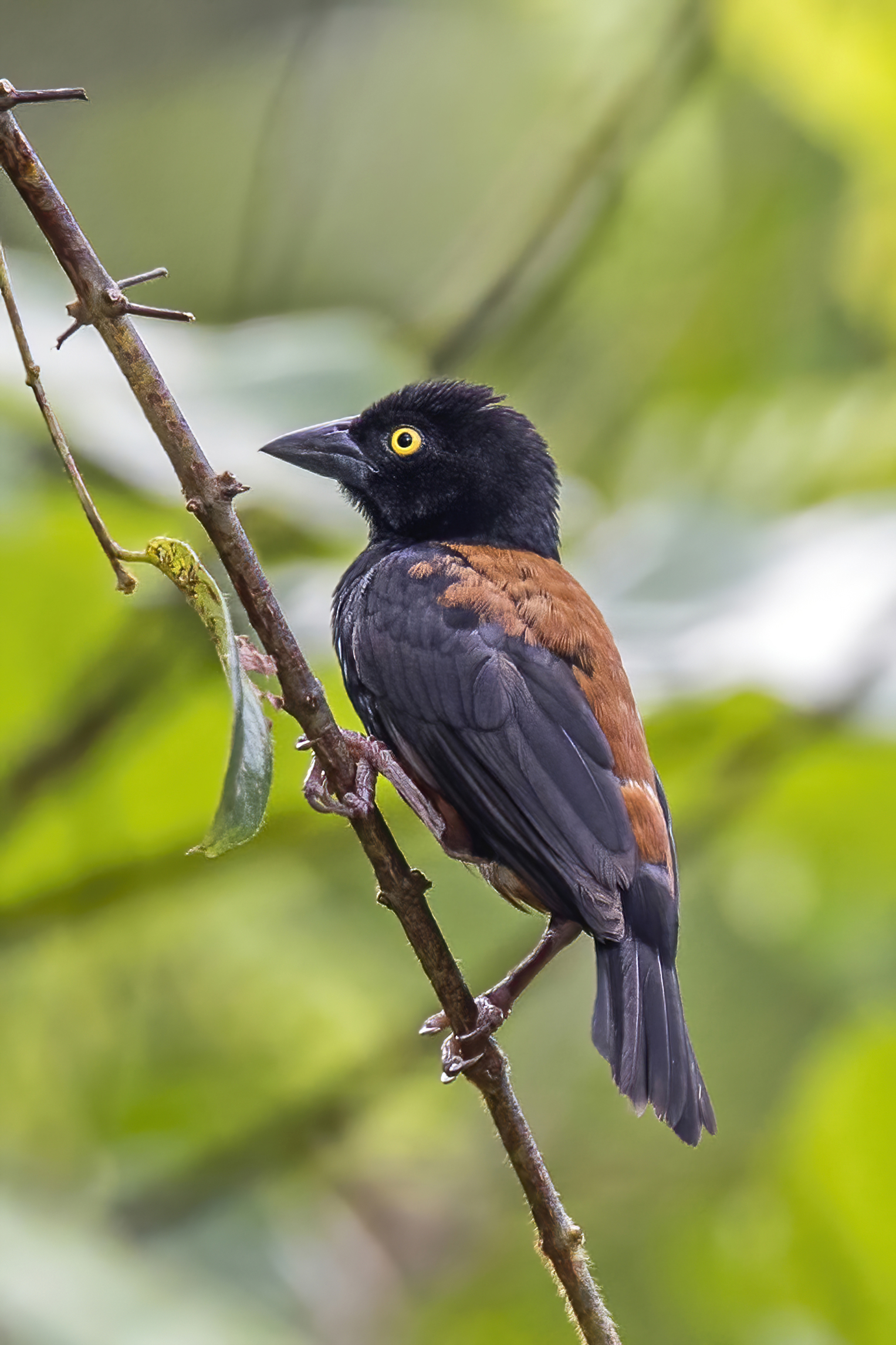
- Male in Ghana

Conservation status
- Least Concern (IUCN 3.1)

Scientific classification
- Kingdom: Animalia
- Phylum: Chordata
- Class: Aves
- Order: Passeriformes
- Family: Ploceidae
- Genus: Ploceus
- Species: P. castaneofuscus

Binomial name
- Ploceus castaneofuscus Lesson, RP, 1840

= Chestnut-and-black weaver =

Species of bird

The chestnut-and-black weaver (Ploceus castaneofuscus) is a species of bird in the family Ploceidae. It is found in West Africa from Sierra Leone to southern Nigeria.

The chestnut-and-black weaver was formerly treated as a subspecies of Vieillot's black weaver (Ploceus nigerrimus). The species were split based on the striking differences in the colour of the plumage.

== Gallery ==
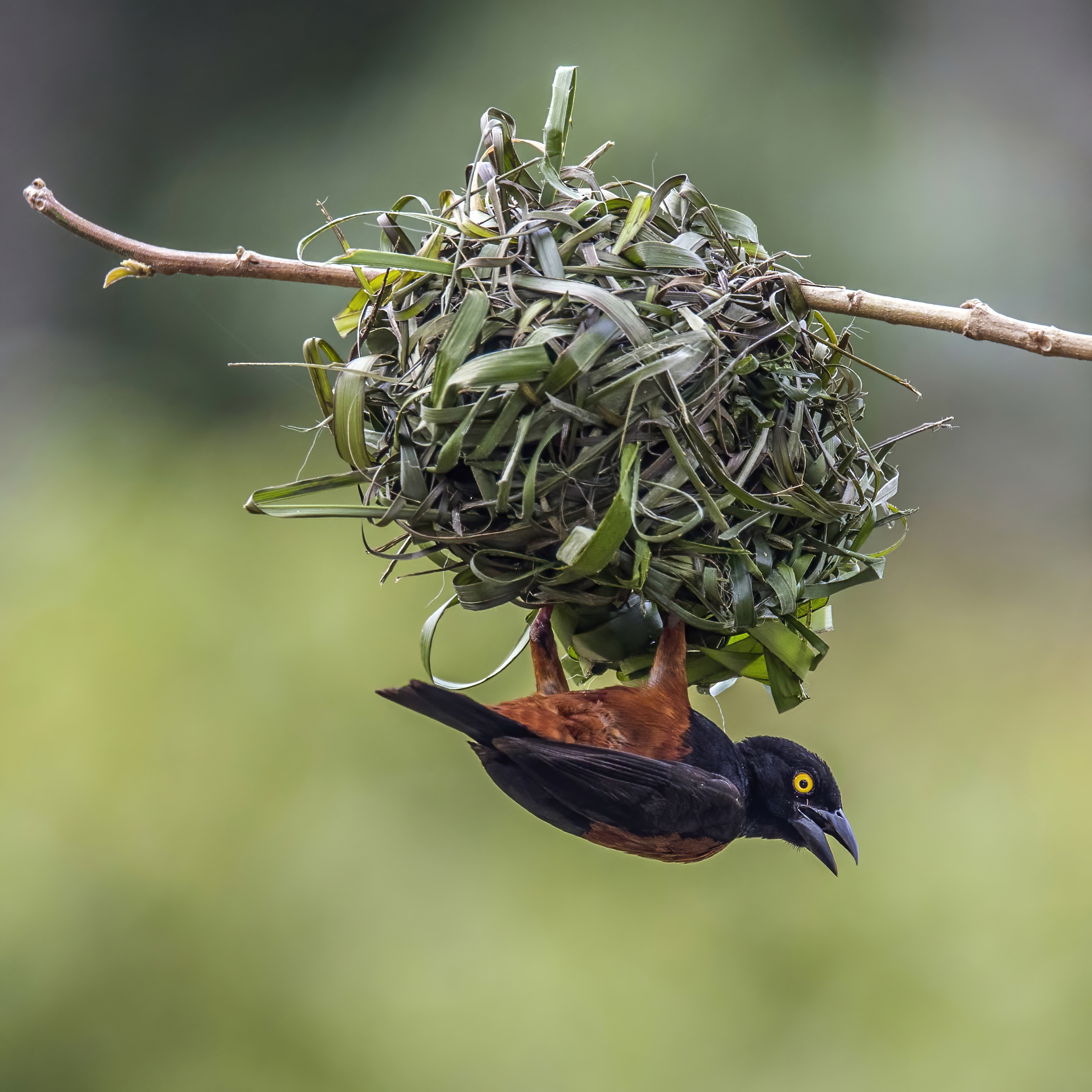
Male on a nest, Ghana
