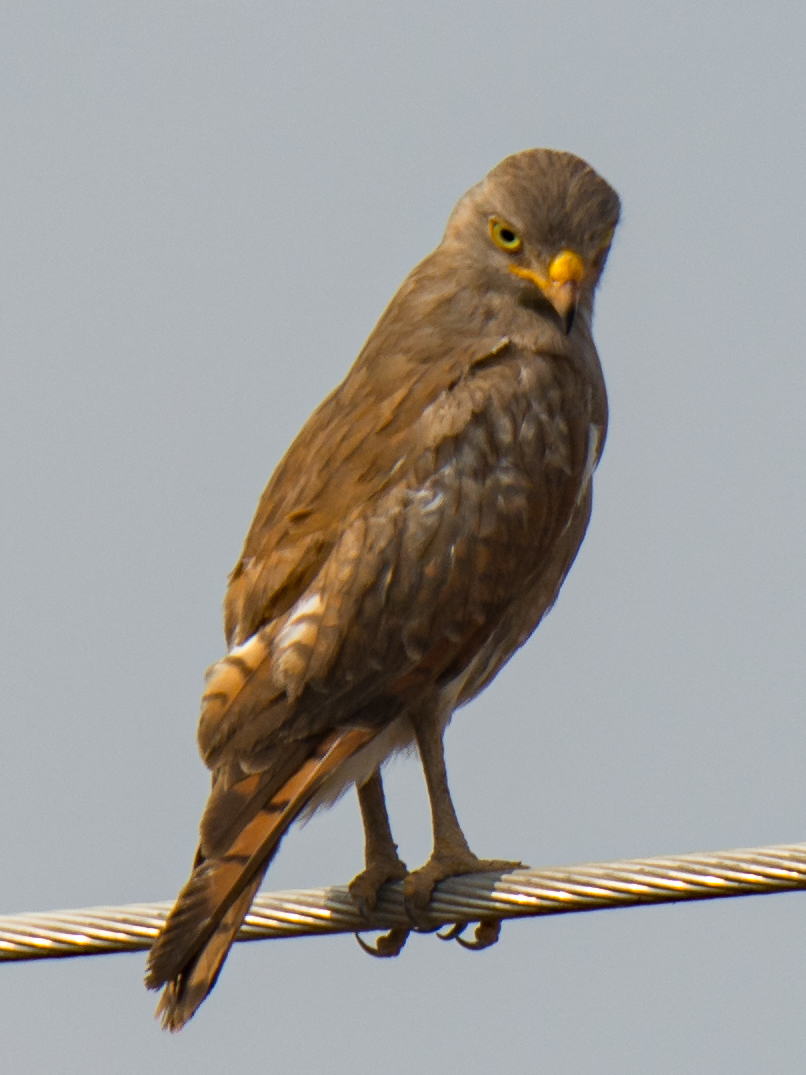

Conservation status
- Least Concern (IUCN 3.1)

Scientific classification
- Kingdom: Animalia
- Phylum: Chordata
- Class: Aves
- Order: Accipitriformes
- Family: Accipitridae
- Genus: Butastur
- Species: B. liventer

Binomial name
- Butastur liventer (Temminck, 1827)

= Rufous-winged buzzard =

Species of bird

The rufous-winged buzzard (Butastur liventer) is an Asian bird of prey. It is a resident breeder of Indochina, Java and Sulawesi. It is a species of deciduous forest and second growth up to 800 m.

The adult rufous-winged buzzard is 38–43 cm long. It has a grey head and underparts, with some streaking on the crown, neck and breast. The rest of the upperparts are rufous grey, and the uppertail is bright rufous. In flight, from above it shows rufous-chestnut flight feathers and the rufous uppertail, and from below it has a grey body, white underwing coverts, and greyish flight feathers and undertail. It is monomorphic. The juvenile is duller and browner, with a brown-grey head and white supercilium.

This species is similar in size and shape to the migratory grey-faced buzzard, but that species has browner upperparts and tail, a white throat, and brown-barred white belly.

The rufous-winged buzzard eats lizards, small mammals and large insects. Its call is a shrill pit-piu.
