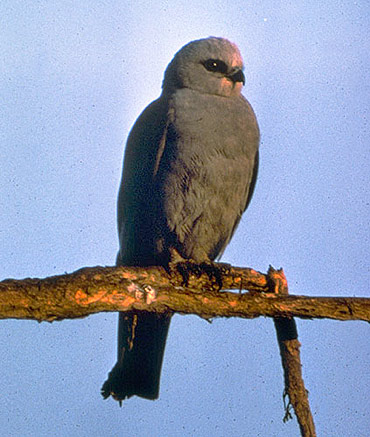
- Mississippi kite, USFWS Photo

Scientific classification
- Domain: Eukaryota
- Kingdom: Animalia
- Phylum: Chordata
- Class: Aves
- Order: Accipitriformes
- Family: Accipitridae
- Subfamily: Buteoninae
- Genus: Ictinia; Vieillot, 1816

Type species
- Falco plumbeus Gmelin, JF, 1788

Species
- I. mississippiensis I. plumbea

= Ictinia =

Genus of birds

Ictinia is a genus of birds in the family Accipitridae. It contains two species that are native to the Americas.

== Taxonomy and species ==
The genus Ictinia was introduced in 1816 by the French ornithologist Louis Pierre Vieillot to accommodate the plumbeous kite which is therefore the type species. The name is from the Ancient Greek word iktinos for a kite. The genus now contains two species.

Genus Ictinia – Vieillot, 1816 – two species
| Common name | Scientific name and subspecies | Range | Size and ecology | IUCN status and estimated population |
|---|---|---|---|---|
| Mississippi kite | Ictinia mississippiensis (Wilson, A, 1811) | United States | Size: Habitat: Diet: | LC |
| Plumbeous kite | Ictinia plumbea (Gmelin, JF, 1788) | eastern Mexico to Peru, Bolivia and Argentina | Size: Habitat: Diet: | LC |
