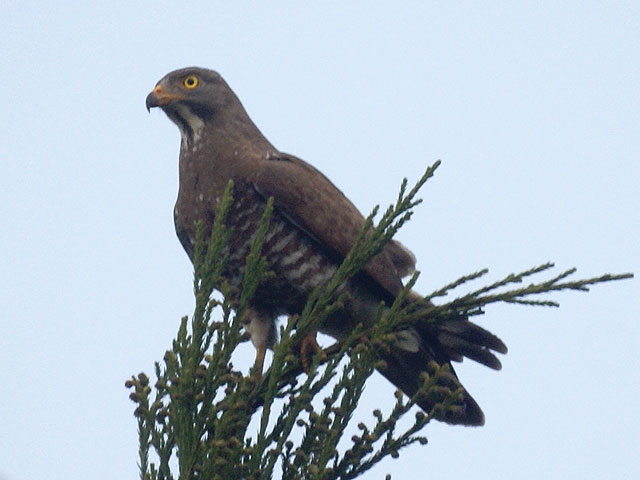

Conservation status
- Least Concern (IUCN 3.1)

Scientific classification
- Kingdom: Animalia
- Phylum: Chordata
- Class: Aves
- Order: Accipitriformes
- Family: Accipitridae
- Genus: Butastur
- Species: B. indicus

Binomial name
- Butastur indicus (Gmelin, JF, 1788)
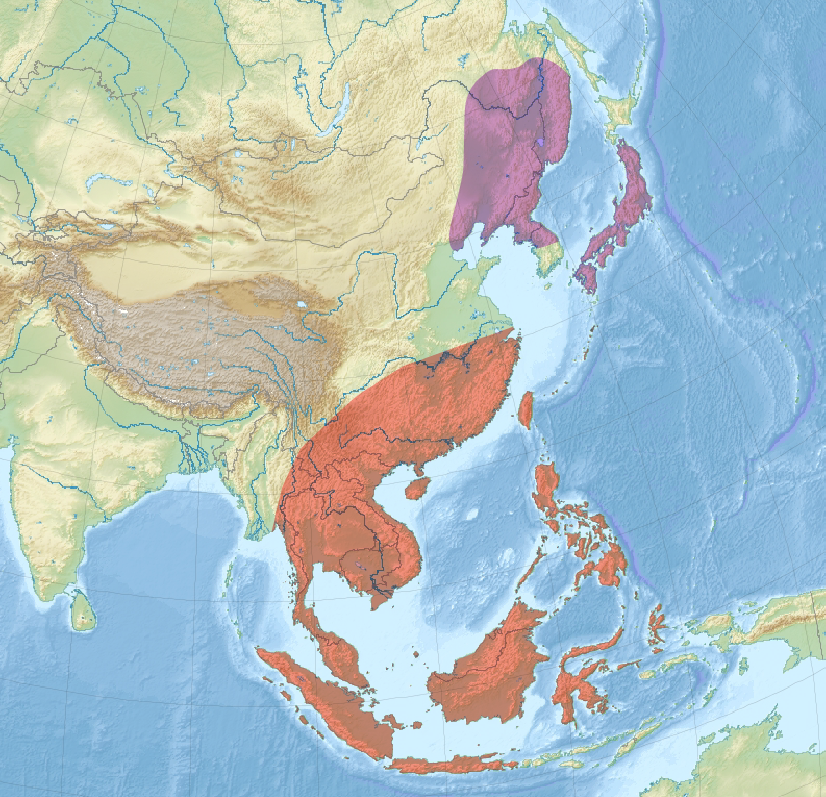
- Violet: breeding; Red: non-breeding

= Grey-faced buzzard =

Species of bird

The grey-faced buzzard (Butastur indicus) is an Asian bird of prey. It is typically 41–46 cm (16–18 in) in length, making it a small-sized raptor. It breeds in Manchuria, Korea and Japan; it winters in South-east Asia.

It is a bird of open land. It eats lizards, small mammals and large insects.

The adult has a grey head, breast and neck, white throat, black moustaches and mesial stripes, brown back and upperwings, and brown bars on white underparts and underwings. The juvenile is brown and mottled above, pale below with brown streaks, and has a broad white supercilium and brown face.

== Taxonomy ==
The gray-faced buzzard was formally described in 1788 by the German naturalist Johann Friedrich Gmelin in his revised and expanded edition of Carl Linnaeus's Systema Naturae. He placed it with the eagles, hawks and relatives in the genus Falco and coined the binomial name Falco indicus. Gmelin based his account on the "Javan hawk" that had been described in 1781 by John Latham from a specimen in the Leverian collection that had been obtained in February 1780 at Princes Island off the westernmost cape of Java during Captain Cook's last voyage. The gray-faced buzzard is now one of four species placed in the genus Butastur that was introduced in 1843 by the English naturalist Brian Houghton Hodgson. The genus name is a portmanteau of the genus Buteo introduced by Bernard Germain de Lacépède for the buzzards and Astur introduced by Lacépède for the goshawks. The specific epithet indicus is Latin for "Indian". The gray-faced buzzard has no recognised subspecies.

== Description ==
The males and females of the grey faced buzzard are the same in coloration. Adults are red & brown on the upper part of the chest while the chest is brown or dark brown. The chest contains dark down bars across the abdomen. The most infrequent color scheme is the full brown bird's also known as dark morph colored. The small-sized raptor is typically 41–46 cm (16–18 in) long. Wings are pointed and narrow; feathers are thin and look transparent when in flight. the tail is ashy brown with horizontal bars on the tail, the iris is bright yellow. Juveniles are often less reddish, with dark brown bars on the abdomen. Also, the face and eye color is brown with a buff color.

== Distribution and habitat ==
The majority of the species are found in Japan or more specifically, Satoyama. The area consists of many different environments; woodlands, paddy-fields, streams, and grasslands. In its breeding range, the buzzard is found in coniferous and mixed evergreen forests in mountains, at forest edges, fields, meadows, marshes, and around agricultural lands.

=== Migration ===
Grey-faced buzzards utilize the world's only oceanic flyway for raptor migration. Wind support and geographic features (i.e. islands) enable the birds to migrate in an oceanic flyway. Grey-faced buzzards arrive in the breeding grounds of Japan from late March to early April. It is assumed that males arrive in the breeding grounds and wait for the female to arrive, while defending their territory. After the female arrives then, nest building and copulation begin. Grey faced buzzards set out on their autumn migration and head south in flocks from late September to mid-October. In Taiwan they are a common spring and summer migrant, and a few remain for the winter on Lanyu Island.

As with most buzzards, these birds utilize rising air currents to gain altitude and cover great distances by soaring during migration. Taiwan lies on a major migration route for the grey faced buzzard, and large numbers may be seen moving southward in October along the Hengchun Peninsula, and northward in late March and early April along the terraced mountains of Taichung and Changhua.

== Behavior and ecology ==
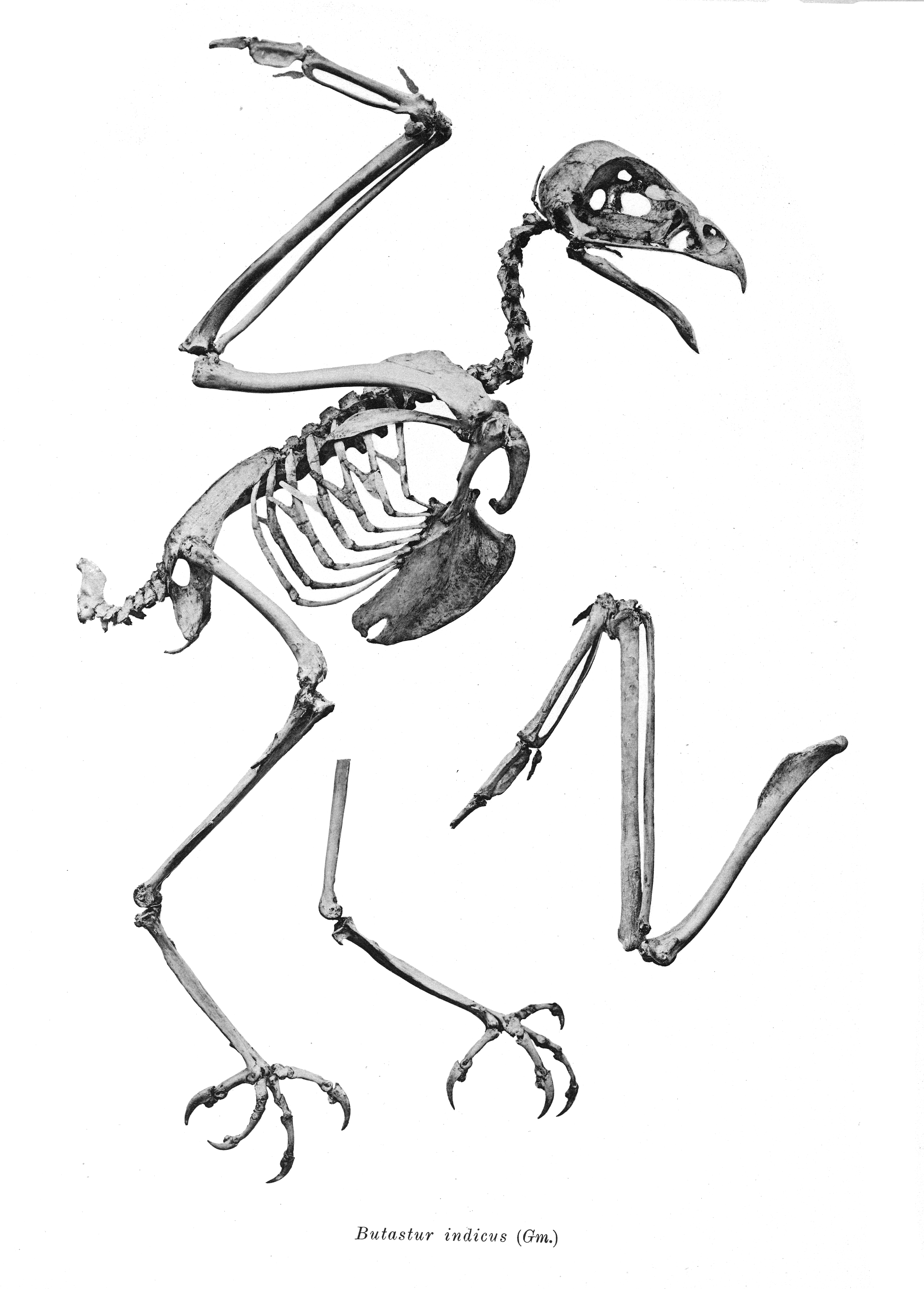
Skeleton

=== Food and feeding ===
During the breeding season the male buzzards spend up to 90% of their day perched searching for prey. Their hunting perch us usually located around 500 meters away from the nest. They feed on frogs, crustaceans, lizards, insects, small rodents and occasionally other birds. They perch on a tree or a utility pole adjacent to an open habitat, such as rice fields, cropland, and clearings, and swoop down to capture with their feet small animals occurring in Satoyama. They adopt a search and ambush hunting method to waste less time and energy but still receive enough to survive.

The birds actively change its diets to fit the foraging site of a particular season. The main vegetation types which characterized to foraging areas of the buzzards varied over the course of the breeding season from paddy fields to levees and grass-arable fields, and eventually to wooded areas. Along with this shift, the main prey of the buzzards changes from frogs to insects. In paddy fields, frogs and small mammals are frequently captured. A variety of prey including frogs, small mammals, lizards, snakes and insects were taken at levees and grass-arable fields. Insects and frogs were captured in woodland areas.

=== Breeding ===
During the breeding season the grey faced buzzard builds a small stick nest placed in a tree. The tree most of the time being a Japanese tree. In China, nests were typically located in dense coniferous or broad-leafed forest patches with thick shrubs, steep slopes, and a northerly slope aspect. The nest is lined with grass and leaves. Clutch size is 3-4 white eggs with rusty or reddish-brown spots. They breed in eastern China, eastern Russia, Japan, and in winter mainly in Indochina, Malaysia and the Philippines.

The same nest is sometimes used every year until the need of reconstruction arises. Females mostly incubate eggs and nestlings. Males relieve females briefly a few times a day. Eggs hatch from late May to early June about a month after they were laid. Nestlings fledge from late June to early July about 35 days after hatching. Fledglings are fed by the parent birds around the nest for about two weeks, and then become independent, starting to move a long distance.

== Relationship to humans ==
Historically, the greatest threat to the grey-faced buzzard in Taiwan has been the uncontrolled hunting of the species in the Baguashan and Hengchun Peninsula areas. Hunting and trapping of grey-faced buzzard in the Baguashan and Hengchun Peninsula areas has gone on for Generations. The Wild Bird Society of Japan and other concerned organizations successfully brought about legislation in Japan that effectively put an end to the importation of raptor skins and the demand for Taiwan grey faced buzzard skins faded.

== Conservation status ==
Grey-faced buzzards were designated as a "Vulnerable" species in December 2006 in Japan. Few concrete protective measures have been taken, however, partly because about 90% of the breeding grounds are privately owned and 75% are not legally protected for wildlife. A basic plan for "Creating a wood Grey-faced buzzards can live" by Toyota City of Aichi Pref. is remarkable. In the Toyota natural Observation Woods, which contain a Satoyama Landscape with Yatsuda, Toyota City has taken the initiative in creating the habitat of frogs grey-faced buzzards prey on and maintaining their foraging grounds by weeding and water management of private fallow rice fields. The conservation of birds of prey with large home range, such as grey-faced buzzards would be promoted by the active involvement of local and regional governments in maintaining an entire local ecosystem including private land in various regions of Japan.
