= Kibale Forest National Park =

Protected area in Uganda

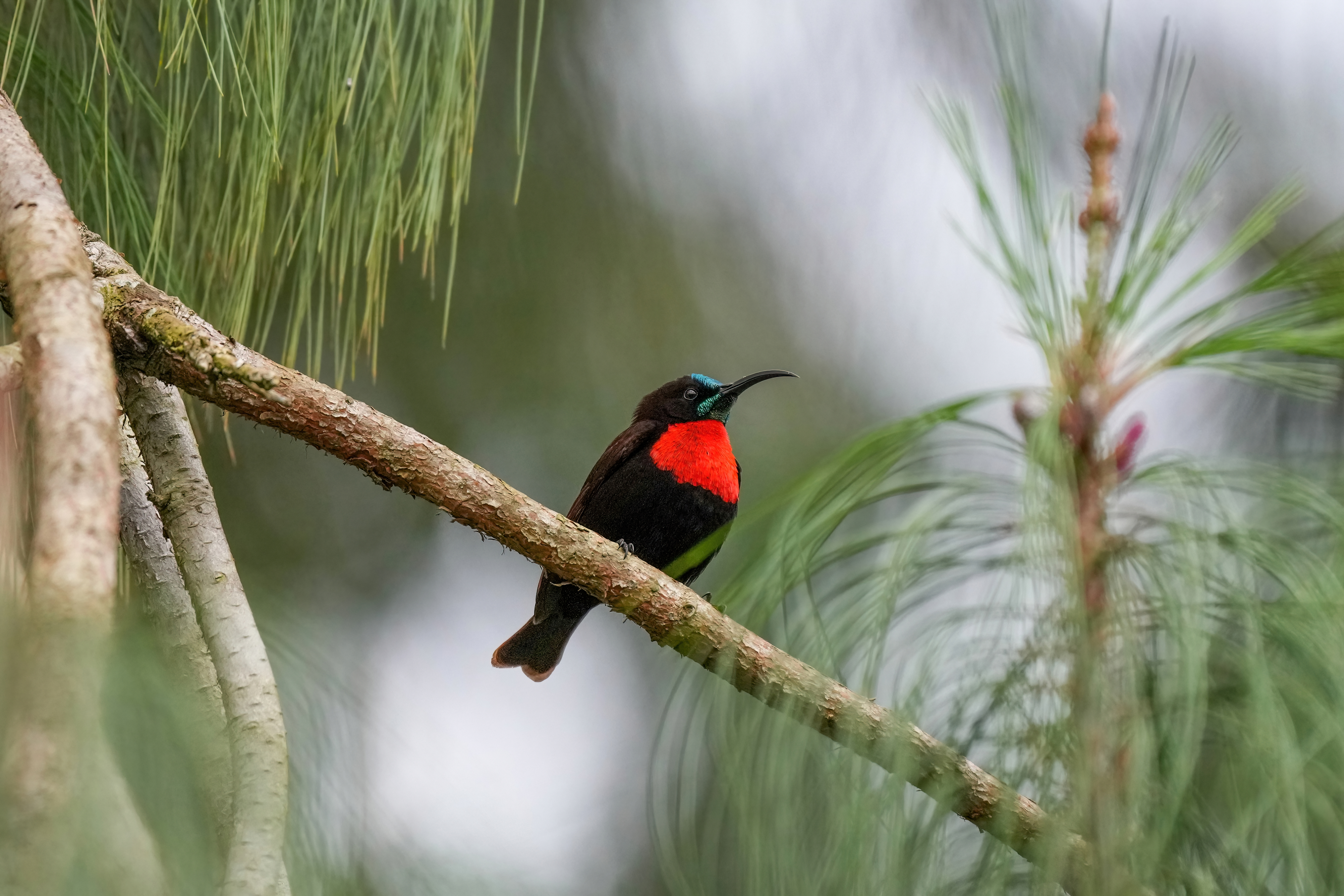
Scarlet-chested sunbird at Kibale forest National Park

Kibale Forest National Park is a protected area in South Western Uganda. It is managed by a cluster of government agencies that include: Uganda Wildlife Authority (UWA) Ministry of Water and Environment (MWE), National Forest Authority (NFA), National Environment Management Authority and Ministry of Tourism, Wildlife & Antiquities. Kibale Forest National Park is a tourist destination that offers wildlife experience to tourists. The park covers a total land area of 766 Square Kilometres.

== Flora and Fauna ==
Kibale Forest National Park is endowed with Flora and Fauna ranging from tree species, bird species and over 120 mammal species with over 351 tree species.

== Wildlife ==
The wildlife at Kibale Forest National Park include: Black and White Colobus Monkey, Elephants, Warthogs, Leopards, Buffalos among others.

== See also ==
- Bwindi Impenetrable Forest
- Budongo Forest
- Mabira Forest
