= Buteogallus milleri =

Buteogallus milleri Temporal range: Quaternary

Scientific classification
- Domain: Eukaryota
- Kingdom: Animalia
- Phylum: Chordata
- Class: Aves
- Order: Accipitriformes
- Family: Accipitridae
- Genus: Buteogallus
- Species: †B. milleri

Binomial name
- †Buteogallus milleri (Howard, 1932)

Synonyms
- Urubitinga milleri (Howard, 1932)

Extinct species of bird

Buteogallus milleri is an extinct species of buteonine hawk. The only remains discovered—a fragmentary coracoid (the holotype) and the distal half of a humerus—are from Hawver Cave in El Dorado County, California. B. milleri was larger than Buteogallus fragilis or Geranoaetus melanoleucus (the black-chested buzzard-eagle), and close in size to the Cuban species Buteogallus borrasi. However, there is not yet enough material to fully assess the similarities between B. milleri and B. borrasi. B. milleri is named after paleontologist Loye Miller.
