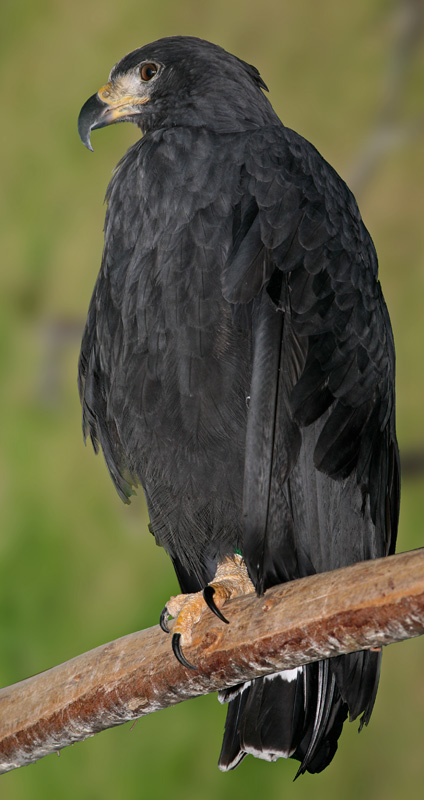

Conservation status
- Near Threatened (IUCN 3.1)

Scientific classification
- Kingdom: Animalia
- Phylum: Chordata
- Class: Aves
- Order: Accipitriformes
- Family: Accipitridae
- Genus: Buteogallus
- Species: B. solitarius

Binomial name
- Buteogallus solitarius (Tschudi, 1844)

Subspecies
- B. s. sheffleri (Van Rossem, 1948); B. s. solitarius (Tschudi, 1844)

Synonyms
- Harpyhaliaetus solitarius

= Solitary eagle =

Species of bird

The solitary eagle or montane solitary eagle (Buteogallus solitarius) is a large Neotropical eagle. It is also known as the black solitary eagle.

== Range and habitat ==
The solitary eagle is native to Mexico and Central and South America. It is found in mountainous or hilly forests, at elevations between 600 m and 2,200 m. The frequent reports from lowlands are usually misidentifications of another species, usually the common black hawk or great black hawk; no reports from lowlands have been confirmed. It is rare in all areas of its range and poorly known. Very little is known about its diet, other than that it appears to have often been predating large snakes and one adult pair was seen hunting deer fawns. The remains of a chachalaca were noted in one nest.

== Description ==
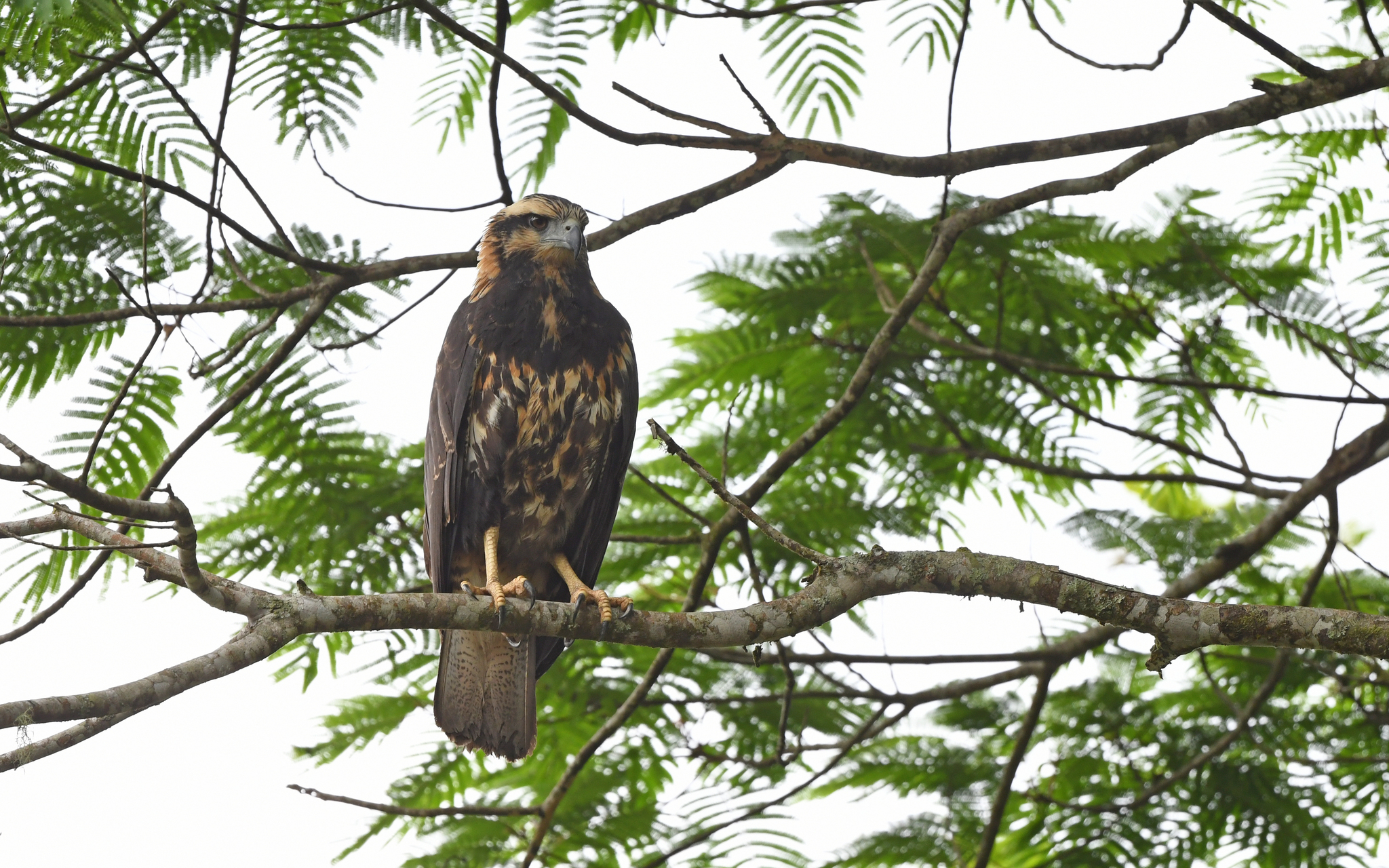
Juvenile, in Peru

The adult solitary eagle is uniformly dark gray, often appearing black, with white markings on the tail. It is 63 to 79 cm (25 to 31 in) and has a 152 to 188 cm (5 ft 0 in to 6 ft 2 in) wingspan. With a body mass of approximately 3 kg (6.6 lb), it appears to rival its similarly-weighted sister species, the Chaco eagle, as one of the larger living members of the Buteoninae subfamily, although the black-chested buzzard-eagle is similar or only marginally smaller in weight, while large Milvini from the genus Haliaeetus and Icthyophaga (such as the Steller's sea eagle) can be significantly larger. It appears very similar to the common black hawk and great black hawk, but is much larger and has significantly broader wings, extending nearly to the tip of the tail. The exceptionally broad wings are one of the prime distinguishing characteristics of this species. Its body also has quite a thickset appearance.

The juvenile is mottled brown and tan, with markings around the eyes. It otherwise resembles the adult.

== Relationships ==
Recent DNA studies have shown that the solitary eagle is closely related to the black-hawks.
