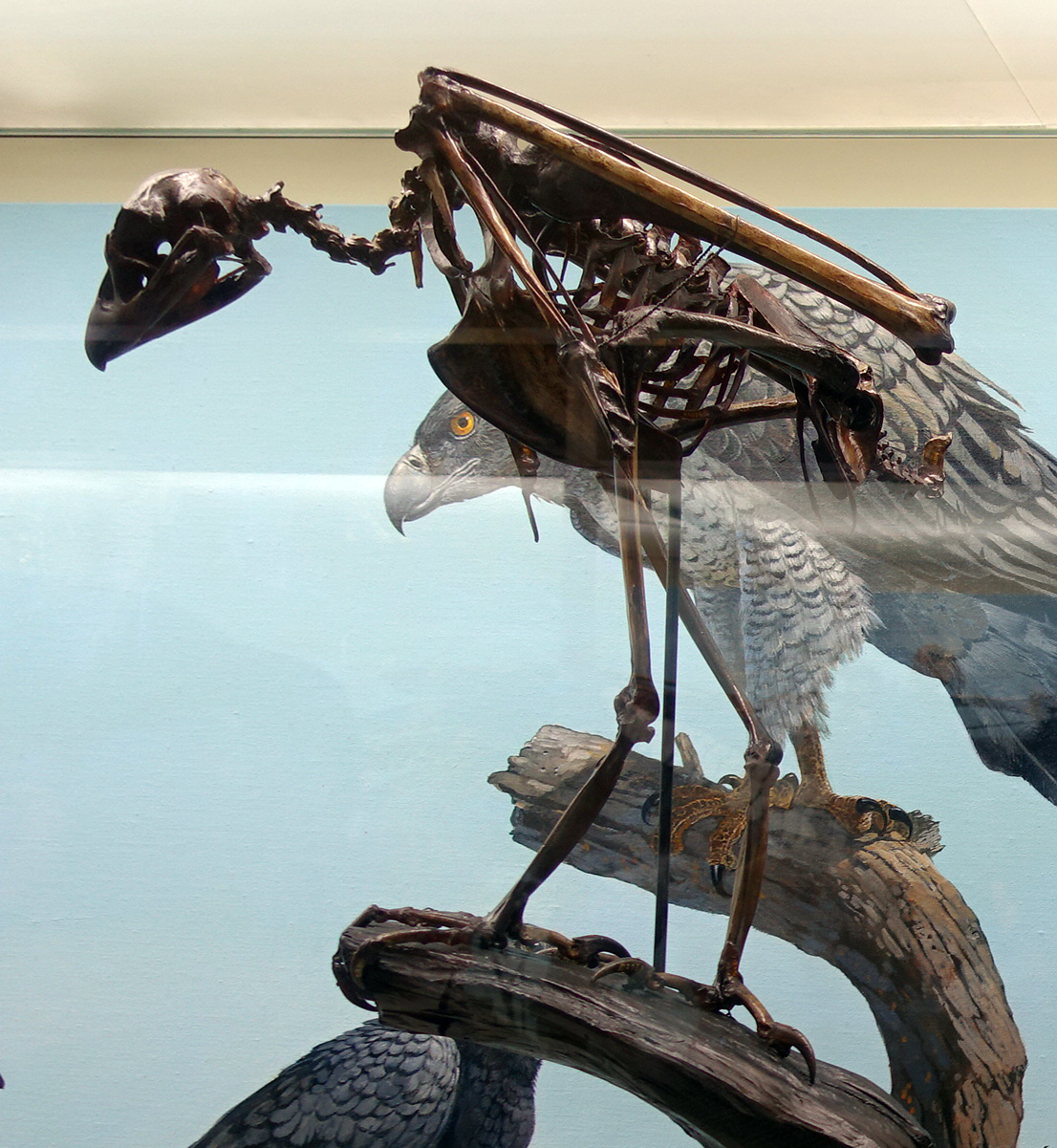
- Skeleton from the La Brea Tar Pits

Scientific classification
- Kingdom: Animalia
- Phylum: Chordata
- Class: Aves
- Order: Accipitriformes
- Family: Accipitridae
- Genus: Buteogallus
- Species: †B. woodwardi

Binomial name
- †Buteogallus woodwardi (L. Miller 1911)

Synonyms
- Amplibuteo woodwardi L. Miller, 1911

= Buteogallus woodwardi =

Buteogallus woodwardi Temporal range: Upper Pleistocene, 0.126–0.0117 Ma

Extinct species of bird

Buteogallus woodwardi is an extinct species of hawk that inhabited North America during the Pleistocene. Fossil remains have been recovered from the La Brea Tar Pits in Southern California. The species was formerly classified within the extinct genus Amplibuteo, but is now recognized as a member of Buteogallus, an extant genus of black hawks within the subfamily Buteoninae comprising numerous species commonly referred to as buzzards or hawks. Fossil material from Cuba previously assigned to B. woodwardi are now regarded as belonging to a distinct species Buteogallus irpus.

== Description and ecology ==
It is among the largest birds of prey known from the fossil record, with an estimated total length of 95.6 to 110.2 cm (37.6 to 43.4 in), making it slightly larger than the modern Harpy eagle. Haast's eagle attained greater lengths and appears to have been more robustly built than Buteogallus woodwardi. Unlike the forest-dwelling Haast's eagle, B. woodwardi appears to have preferred more open habitats, where it prayed primarily on small mammals and reptiles.

Buteogallus woodwardi has been suggested to be particularly similar to the modern Chaco and solitary eagle. Both species were formerly classified within the genus Harpyhaliaetus, which, along with Amplibuteo, was subsequently placed within Buteogallus. The Chaco and solitary eagles are characterized by broad wings, relatively short and broad tails, predominantly dark plumage and prominent crests over the occipital region, features that B. woodwardi may also have possessed. The diet of the modern solitary eagle has been suggested to be broadly similar to that of its extinct relative, albeit on a smaller scale, with reptiles and small mammals constituting a substantial portion of its food resources; Buteogallus woodwardi likely hunted similar prey in open habitats, potentially including animals as large as small deer.
