= Titanohierax =

Titanohierax Temporal range: Pleistocene

Scientific classification
- Kingdom: Animalia
- Phylum: Chordata
- Class: Aves
- Order: Accipitriformes
- Family: Accipitridae
- Genus: †Titanohierax; Wetmore, 1937
- Species: †T. gloveralleni

Binomial name
- †Titanohierax gloveralleni Wetmore, 1937

Extinct genus of birds

Titanohierax gloveralleni, also known as the Bahama eagle, is a large species of extinct hawk from the Late Quaternary of the Caribbean. Remains of the animal have been found on multiple islands in the Bahamas. The animal is known from a handful of bones found across multiple islands, including a tarsometatarsus, partial metacarpal, and nearly complete right ulna. The animal was described based on the former two by Alexander Wetmore in 1937, with all other currently referred material being assigned by Storrs Olson and colleagues in 1982.

During the Pleistocene, T. gloveralleni would have been an apex predator of the Bahamian islands, feeding on animals including the large hutia Geocapromys. It is thought that a decline in suitable habitat for both it and its preferred prey items, along with possible pressure from human activity, would have led to the decline and eventual extinction of the animal.

== History of discovery ==
The first remains of Titanohierax were discovered in 1937 and were found in cavern deposits on Little Exuma, an island in The Bahamas. The remains were found by Vivienne Knowles, who separated them from the cave earth that was to be used as fertilizer. The small collection of bones recovered included several bird species, namely two extinct hawks, an extinct owl, and remains of a crow and a woodpecker. The latter two of these are similar to forms found in modern Cuba. The remains were described by Alexander Wetmore later in the same year, and he named one of the two extinct hawks as the new species Titanohierax gloveralleni. The species diagnosis was based on a single tarsometatarsus, which Wetmore noted to be similar to the great black hawk Buteogallus urubitinga, at that time known as Hypomorphnus urubitinga. He also assigned a partial metacarpal to the genus based on its massive size and, again, similarity to the morphology of the element in B. urubitinga.

Wetmore mistakenly noted these fossils as coming from the island of Great Exuma, and only in a 1955 paper by Max Hecht did the first evidence for this appear. Hecht noted sites matching the description given by Wetmore, with them having all their fossiliferous soils removed. The remains of the holotype of Titanohierax were most likely found in the Upper Pasture Cave, which is located "about fifty feet above sea level facing the western side of Little Exuma".

Although there was much uncertainty in estimating the age of the aforementioned cave deposits, they were thought to be of considerable antiquity, predating European arrival in the Americas. Pierce Brodkorb gives the first confident dating of the extinct Bahaman avifauna that Titanohierax was a part of in 1959, with the discovery of fossil material from a deposit on New Providence Island, Bahamas. The site, a sinkhole in limestone on the western side of the island, was found in 1958 by Dr. J. C. Dickinson Jr., who then carried out preliminary excavations together with Dr. Walter Auffenberg in August of the same year. Due to the presence of a large banana tree growing in the sinkhole, they designated the site “Banana Hole”. Based on a number of lines of evidence both geological and faunal, the age of the site was estimated to the Wisconsin glacial stage, specifically the pre-Pamlico portion. This puts the age of the site at around 17.000 years old.

Brodkorb had noted in 1959 that the accumulation of remains at the Banana Hole site must have been caused by the activity of a large raptor, and would be proven right in a 1982 publication by Storrs Olson and colleagues, which tentatively attributed a nearly complete right ulna and a fragment of a left ulna from the site to Titanohierax. The referral was made mostly based on the large size of the specimens. The same publication would also refer a mostly complete tarsometatarsus from another site to the animal. These referrals would extend the known range of Titanohierax to the islands of New Providence and Hispaniola. The 1982 publication would also refer a few specimens collected from Cuban deposits to Titanohierax. The material consisted of two distal portions of tibiotarsi, a femur lacking the distal end, and some pedal phalanges, and was named Aquila borrasi by Oscar Arredondo in 1972. However, notes from Arredondo's late collaborator Bryan Patterson would reveal that he already had the suspicion that these remains were of a species of Titanohierax, leading to the new combination Titanohierax borrasi.

The next significant mention of Titanohierax would come in a 1994 publication by Gary Morgan, where he assigned two mandibular symphyses from a cave on Grand Cayman to Titanohierax, based on their size and morphological similarity to Buteogallus. In 2004, William Suárez published a paper that would refute the referral of Aquila borrasi to Titanohierax, based on new well-preserved material, establishing that even though borrasi was a valid species, it did not belong to the genus Titanohierax. This reduced the range of the animal considerably, with no Cuban material being referred to it any longer. He would describe the animal formally together with Storrs Olson in 2007, referring it to the genus Buteogallus. This paper would also see the material referred to Titanohierax by Morgan in 1994 being taken from it, instead being listed as Accipitridae gen. et sp. indet. A 2019 paper by David Steadman and colleagues listed the referred material from Hispaniola as being much too long and gracile to belong to T. gloveralleni.

== Description ==
Titanohierax was a very large hawk, with an estimated weight of around 7.3 kg (16 lb), making it roughly equal in size to the females of the largest living eagles. The animal is solely known from a tarsometatarsus, partial metacarpal, and two ulnae.

Titanohierax's tarsometatarsus is much larger than that of any living buteogalline, which are its closest relatives. Wetmore's 1937 description of the animal directly compares it to Buteogallus urubitinga, noting a number of differences: The bone is broader at its distal end, with a number of differences being noted in the trochlea and their connection to the shaft, also being more robust and pronounced. Besides this, the surface where the hallux articulates extends higher on the shaft, which is also more robust. Wetmore also described a partial metacarpal, which he referred to the species based on its similarity to B. urubitinga, and its massive size. Based on the size of the tarsometatarsus and metacarpal, Wetmore estimated that Titanohierax would have been near twice the size of B. urubitinga.

The ulna of the animal was also of a considerable size, with the total length of a specimen from the Florida State Museum having been estimated at 210 mm (8.3 in) long and 10 mm (0.39 in) wide at its broadest extent.

== Classification ==
Though originally being noted as closely related to the genus Hypomorphnus (=Buteogallus) by Wetmore, later studies would indicate that T. gloveralleni was more closely related to taxa of the genus Geranoaetus. The extinct crab-hawk Buteogallus borrasi was formerly placed in the Titanohierax genus with T. gloveralleni but was assigned to the genus Buteogallus in 2007.

== Paleobiology ==
During the Pleistocene, Titanohierax was an apex predator on the Bahaman islands. Brodkorb noted in 1959 that the remains found at the Banana Hole site were probably accumulated through the feeding activities of raptorial birds, already hinting at the fact that they filled a major predatory niche on the islands. Olson and colleagues would go on to note that the extinction of Titanohierax and other large raptors from the West Indies was likely linked to a decline in the presence of the rodent Geocapromys, which is assumed to have been a preferred prey item. Jessica Oswald and Steadman corroborate this in a 2018 publication, listing the loss of preferred habitat as another possible factor in the decline and eventual extinction of the animal. They go on to mention that the decrease in size of the Caribbean islands following the end of the last glaciation event probably did not play a substantial part in their extinction.

== Paleoenvironment ==
When Titanohierax was alive 17.000 years ago, the Bahamas were much different from how they are today. The 29 islands and 661 cays that make up the archipelago would have been linked together due to a drop in sea level, consolidating them into five major islands and a handful of minor islands. During this time, also referred to as the Wisconsinan glacial stage, the temperature on the islands would have been lower than today, with estimates suggesting a decrease of up to 4 degrees Celsius. The Bahaman fossil record provides evidence for this and for an altered floral community as well, the latter being in line with altered conditions throughout the West Indies during this time.

Even from the first description of Titanohierax, it was evident that the avifauna of the Bahamas and the extended Caribbean was much richer in the recent past than it is in the modern day. Brodkorb writes that the avifauna appeared to be around 40% richer than that of the modern-day Bahamas, and that the faunal tie to the Greater Antilles was stronger than today, while the tie to Florida was weaker than in the modern day. The relatively meager avifauna of the modern-day Bahamas is explained through the small surface area of the group when compared to other landmasses from the Caribbean like Cuba, Hispaniola, and Florida. This also explains why the avifauna in the recent past was more diverse, considering the fact that the island group had a greatly increased surface area during periods of glaciation.
