= Buteogallus borrasi =

Buteogallus borrasi Temporal range: Pleistocene-Early Holocene

Scientific classification
- Kingdom: Animalia
- Phylum: Chordata
- Class: Aves
- Order: Accipitriformes
- Family: Accipitridae
- Genus: Buteogallus
- Species: †B. borrasi

Binomial name
- †Buteogallus borrasi (Arredondo, 1970)

Synonyms
- Aquila borrasi (Arredondo, 1970); Titanohierax borrasi (Olson and Hilgartner, 1970)

Extinct species of bird

Buteogallus borrasi is a species of giant buteonine hawk which went extinct in the early Holocene. Formerly endemic to Cuba, this huge bird of prey probably fed on Pleistocene megafauna. Little is known about its appearance and ecology, so no common name has been given.

Because of its eagle-like size, it was originally assigned to Aquila borrasi. In 1982 the new binomial name Titanohierax borrasi was suggested; Aquila borrasi was found valid again in 2004. A 2007 study earned it its current classification and found close similarities to the extant great black hawk (Buteogallus urubitinga).

== Description ==
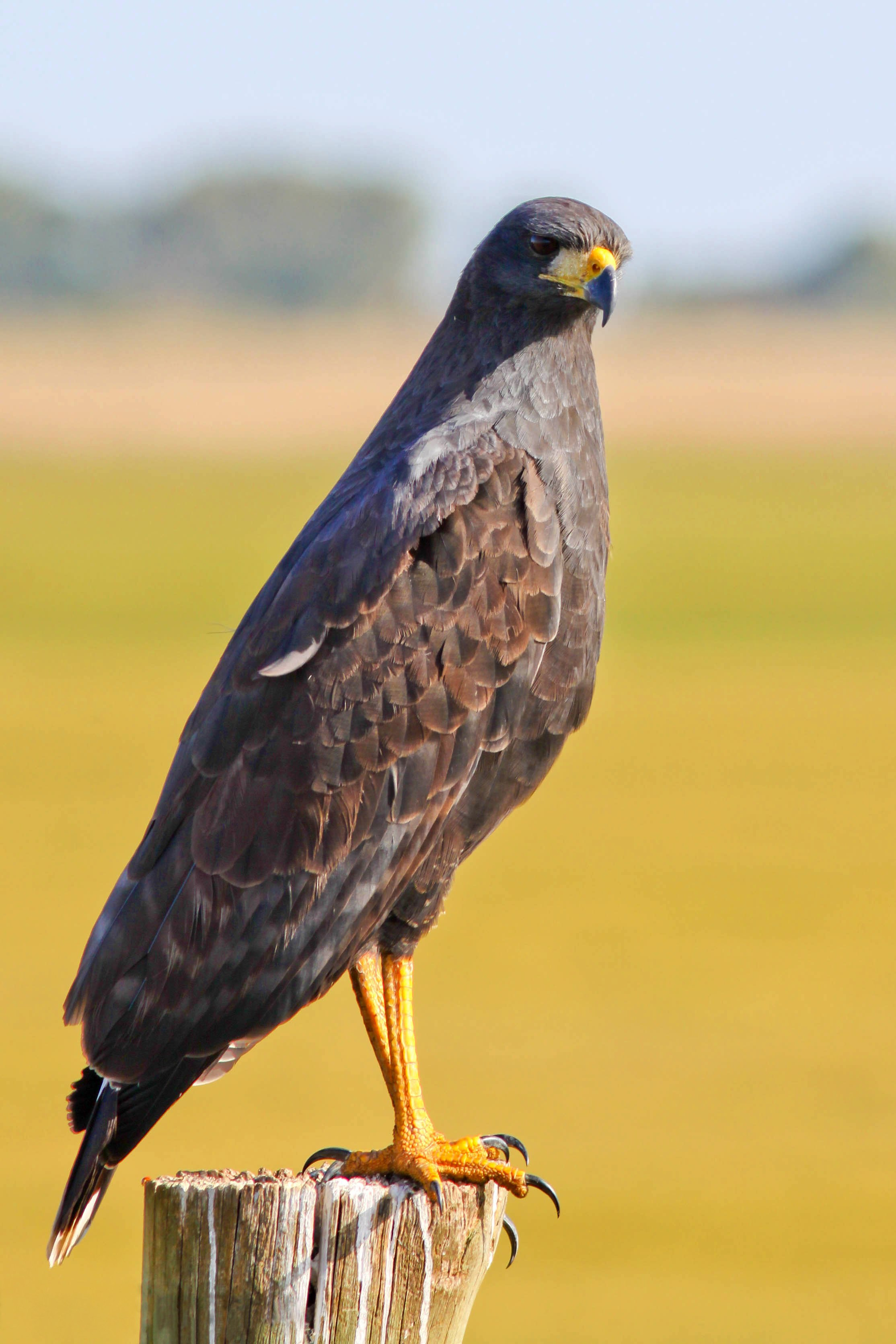
Great black hawk (Buteogallus urubutinga), closest relative of B. borrasi

The latest scientific research describes B. borrasi as very similar to its extant relative, the great black hawk (B. urubitinga). However, it was one third as big again as that bird. Compared to other large birds of prey that shared its habitat—Woodward's eagle, Titanohierax and Gigantohierax—it had relatively gracile features.

== History ==
Oscar Arredondo described B. borrasi in 1970, based on finds from Western Cuba: an incomplete left tarsometatarsus (the holotype), a fragmentary right femur and some phalanges. In 1982 Storrs L. Olson and William Hilgartner examined the holotype and, finding it dissimilar to Aquila tarsometatarsi, suggested it be referred to Titanohierax gloveralleni.

In 1999, Arredondo realized the femur and one of the phalanges did not belong to B. borrasi, and assigned them to the new species Gigantohierax suarezi.

In 2004, William Suárez concluded that the species was valid but could not be referred to the genus Titanohierax. Meanwhile, a considerable amount of new fossil material was being discovered. Olson and Suárez reassigned the bird to Buteogallus in 2007. They found the tarsometatarsus and tibiotarsus far too slender and elongate for an Aquila eagle, but very similar to those of the great black hawk (B. urubitinga). Some mismatches were attributed to the size difference between the two species.

== Paleoecology ==
Fossil remains of B. borrasi are known only from Cuba. However, it has been postulated to have roam the wider West Indies and perhaps even mainland North America. It is the most common fossil accipitrid in Quaternary deposits of Cuba, notably at Llanura Meridional de La Habana. These deposits are thought to be from a savanna environment.

The shape of the tarsus suggests a bird that hunts on the wing, and the mammalian fauna of the time suggests a diet of small- to medium-sized rodents and insectivora, which may have been supplemented with reptiles in open areas. Olson suggests two possible origins for B. borrasi: either it diverged from B. urubitinga in Cuba, or it evolved on the mainland and eventually became extinct there, leaving a relict population in Cuba.

== In culture ==
Buteogallus borrasi (under the synonym Aquila borrasi) is featured on a 1982 Cuban postage stamp, part of a series on prehistoric animals. However, the illustration—derivative of a work by Arthur B. Singer—actually depicts an ornate hawk-eagle (Spizaetus ornatus).
