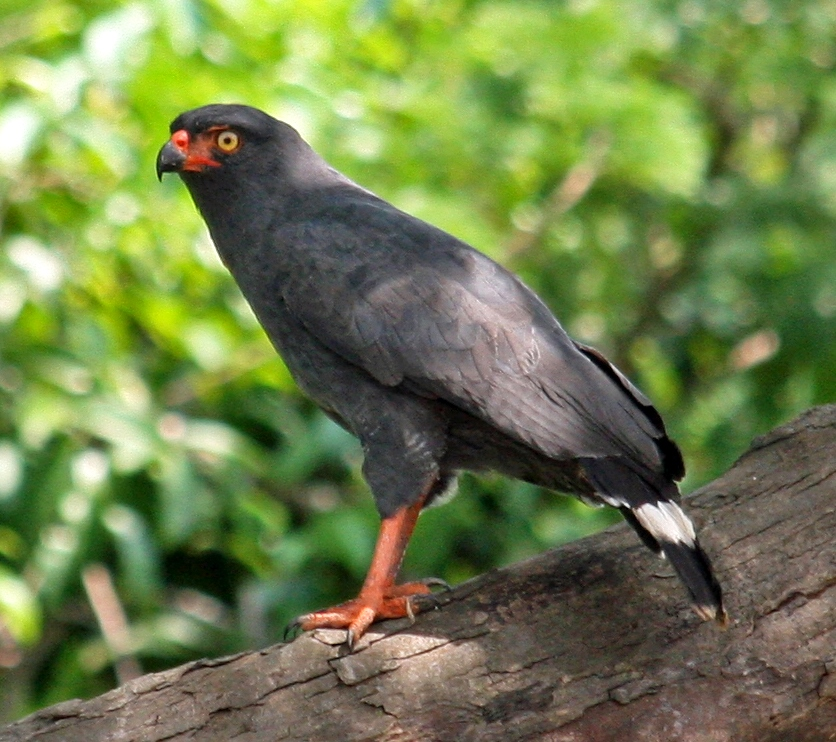
- in Anavilhanas National Park, Amazonas, Brazil

Conservation status
- Least Concern (IUCN 3.1)

Scientific classification
- Kingdom: Animalia
- Phylum: Chordata
- Class: Aves
- Order: Accipitriformes
- Family: Accipitridae
- Genus: Buteogallus
- Species: B. schistaceus

Binomial name
- Buteogallus schistaceus (Sundevall, 1850)

Synonyms
- Leucopternis schistaceus

= Slate-colored hawk =

Species of bird

The slate-colored hawk (Buteogallus schistaceus) is a species of bird of prey in the family Accipitridae: the hawks, eagles, and allies. It is found in the Amazon rainforest in Brazil, Bolivia, Peru, Ecuador, Colombia, Venezuela, and French Guiana.

== Description ==
It is a medium-sized to large bird, typically about 40 cm (16 in) long. It is medium slate-grey in color, with contrasting bright white horizontal banding on its tail feathers. It has a medium-white breast with vertical black markings. It has a large orange cere at the base of its beak, and large yellow eyes.

== Distribution and behavior ==
The slate-colored hawk inhabits most of the Amazon rainforest, primarily in várzea and especially in areas near water like rivers, swamps or mangrove. It hunts for frogs, snakes, small mammals, crabs and other small animals, often at the water edges.
