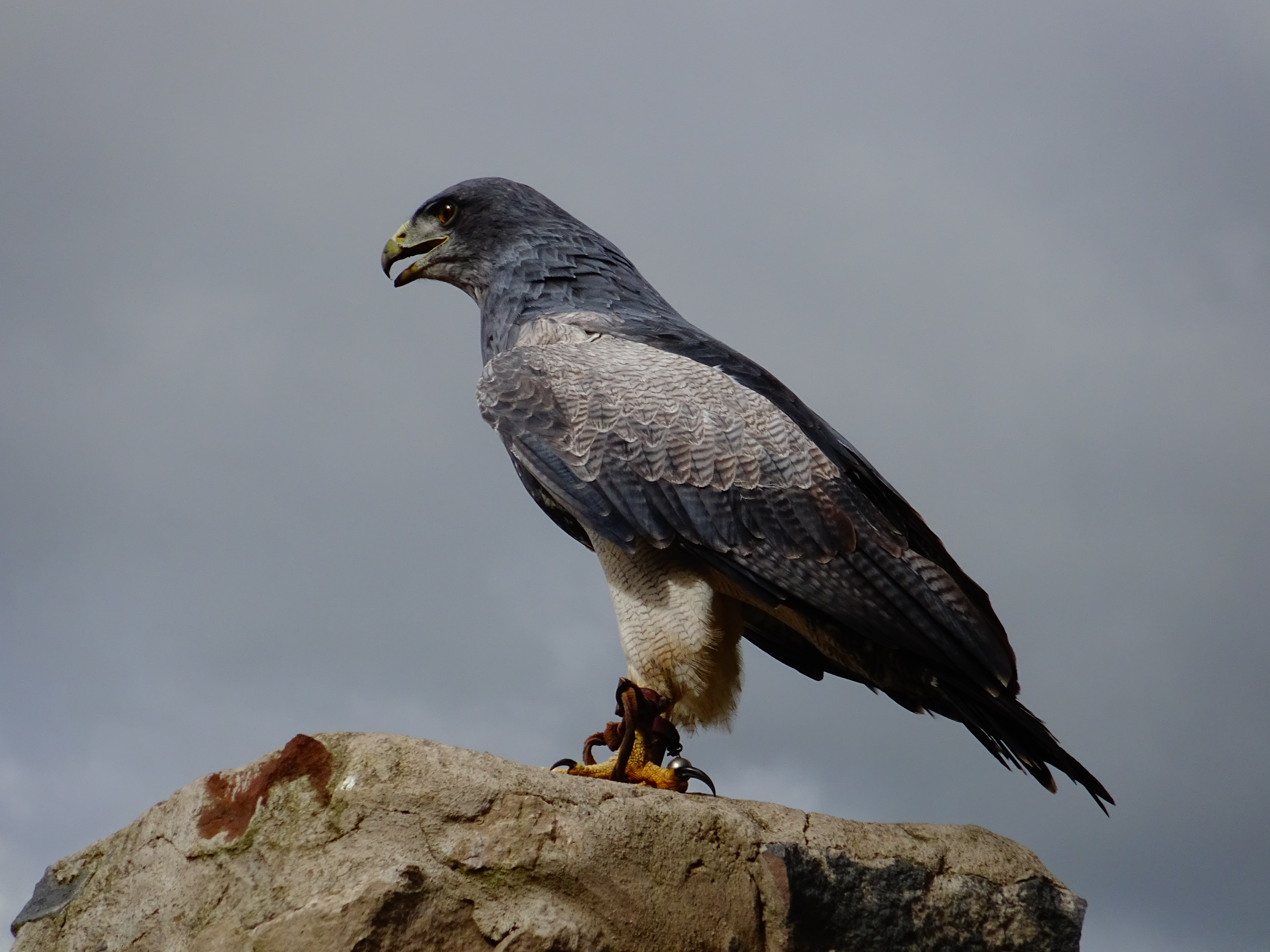

Conservation status
- Least Concern (IUCN 3.1)

Scientific classification
- Kingdom: Animalia
- Phylum: Chordata
- Class: Aves
- Order: Accipitriformes
- Family: Accipitridae
- Genus: Geranoaetus
- Species: G. melanoleucus

Binomial name
- Geranoaetus melanoleucus (Vieillot, 1819)
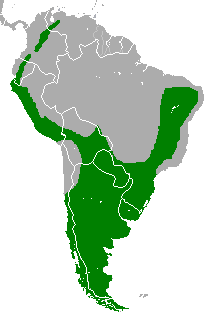
- Range of Geranoaetus melanoleucus

Synonyms
- Buteo fuscescens (Vieillot, 1819); Buteo melanoleucus (Vieillot, 1819; non Vieillot, 1816: preoccupied); Spizaetus fuscescens Vieillot, 1819; Spizaetus melanoleucus Vieillot, 1819 (non Vieillot, 1816: preoccupied) but see text

= Black-chested buzzard-eagle =

Species of bird

The black-chested buzzard-eagle (Geranoaetus melanoleucus) is a bird of prey of the hawk and eagle family (Accipitridae). It lives in open regions of South America. This species is also known as the black buzzard-eagle, the gray buzzard-eagle, or analogously with "eagle" or "eagle-buzzard" replacing "buzzard-eagle", or as the Chilean blue eagle. It is sometimes placed in the genus Buteo.

== Taxonomy and systematics ==
Its scientific name is Latinized Ancient Greek and means "black-and-white crane-eagle" or (if called Buteo melanoleucos) "black-and-white buzzard": Geranoaetus comes from Ancient Greek géranos (γέρανoς), "crane" + aetós (ἆετός), "eagle". The "crane" reference is due to its grey upper wings and its loud cries. The alternative genus name Buteo is simply the Latin term used for these hawks in Ancient Rome, translating as "buzzard" (in the European sense). melanoleucus is from Ancient Greek mélan- (μέλαν-), "black-" + leukós (λευκός), "white". This refers to the contrasting coloration when seen from below.

When the black-chested buzzard-eagle was first described by Louis Pierre Vieillot in 1819, it was placed in the genus Spizaetus, as Spizaetus melanoleucus. Nowadays, however, the monotypic genus Spizastur is merged in Spizaetus, and the black-and-white hawk-eagle, originally described as by Vieillot three years earlier as Buteo melanoleucus, is now known as Spizaetus melanoleucus. The earlier use of the specific epithet melanoleucus for the black-and-white hawk-eagle technically precludes its use for the black-chested buzzard-eagle, except when it is placed in Geranoaetus. In fact, in the mid-20th century Buteo fuscescens was the prevailing name for the black-chested buzzard-eagle for some years, but it was eventually dismissed as erroneous. This specific name was established – as Spizaetus fuscescens – by Vieillot for the immature of the black-chested buzzard-eagle at the very same time as he described the adult because he could not believe that such differently-colored birds were conspecific.

As the two birds are not placed in the same genus today, Article 59.3 of the ICZN Code applies. According to this, a junior homonym replaced before 1961 is not rendered permanently invalid (as junior homonyms usually are) if "the substitute name is not in use" – which has been the case after Amadon's 1963 revision. Hence, in this case, the scientific name Buteo melanoleucus can apply, even though the black-and-white hawk-eagle was earlier described under exactly that name, while the senior homonym melanoleucus still applies to the latter species when placed in Spizaetus according to the usual ICZN rules. Consequently, the proper name to use for each bird has through a number of coincidences become the one the other species was described under.

=== Systematics ===
The black-chested buzzard-eagle is allied to the Buteo hawks, and it is sometimes included with these. Other authors place it in the monotypic genus Geranoaetus. Though the former seems to be more appropriate from a phylogenetic standpoint, the latter is still used here, as much more research into phylogeny and hybridization has to take place before the correct taxonomy of the buteonines can be resolved. It stands to note that the taxonomic and systematic dispute goes back to the early-mid 20th century already. However, it seems there is no real reason to suppose that the lineage of the black-chested buzzard-eagle is North American in origin; fossils that might have been its ancestors, at first sight, differ in details and are more likely to belong to other buteonine lineages. Because of its buteonine lineage, this species and the closely related Harpyhaliaetus are not considered "true eagles", as are Aquila eagles and "hawk-eagles", and are thus the largest extant type of the diverse buteonine lineage.

This species could be close to the white-tailed hawk (Buteo albicaudatus), and perhaps to the grey-backed (Leucopternis occidentalis), white (L. albicollis), and mantled hawks (L. polionotus) which it resembles in habitus except for being larger. Its closest living relatives may well be the red-backed (B. polyosoma) and Puna hawks (B. poecilochrous). Particularly some populations of the former look like small black-chested buzzard eagles. The barred hawk (L. princeps) looks similar to the black-chested buzzard-eagle in general color pattern, though the tail differs much in shape, size, and the bright white central band stands out.

The relationship of the black-chested buzzard-eagle to the prehistoric genera Titanohierax from the Caribbean and the Pan-American Amplibuteo also warrants more study. The crab-hawks (Buteogallus) and the solitary "eagles" (Harpyhaliaetus) seem to be allied with the latter, to the extent that these three genera might be united in Buteogallus. That genus in the present restricted sense contains species also quite similar in habitus and size to the black-chested eagle-buzzard.

=== Subspecies ===
There are two subspecies:

Image	Subspecies	Description	Distribution
	Eastern black-chested buzzard-eagle	Larger, Plain white below.	SE South America from S and E Brazil (Alagoas, Rio de Janeiro, and São Paulo states) through Paraguay, Uruguay, and NE Argentina
	G. m. melanoleucus (Vieillot, 1819)	Larger, Plain white below.	SE South America from S and E Brazil (Alagoas, Rio de Janeiro, and São Paulo states) through Paraguay, Uruguay, and NE Argentina
	Western black-chested buzzard-eagle	Smaller. White with fine dark barring below.	Andes from NW Venezuela (Mérida) through Colombia (Cordillera Central, occasionally ranging into the Cordillera Occidental), Ecuador, Peru, Bolivia, Chile, and W Argentina to Tierra del Fuego
	G. m. australis Swann, 1922	Smaller. White with fine dark barring below.	Andes from NW Venezuela (Mérida) through Colombia (Cordillera Central, occasionally ranging into the Cordillera Occidental), Ecuador, Peru, Bolivia, Chile, and W Argentina to Tierra del Fuego

=== Fossil record ===
Some fossils have been placed in Geranoaetus, but those from North America have since been moved elsewhere:

- "Geranoaetus" ales, "G." contortus and "G." conterminus are now in Buteo.
- "Geranoaetus" fragilis (Fragile "eagle") and "G." milleri (Miller's "eagle") are now in Buteogallus. The type specimens of the latter were at first erroneously believed to be of the black-chested eagle-buzzard.
- "Geranoaetus" grinnelli (Grinnell's "eagle") is now in Spizaetus.
- "Geranoaetus" dananus, originally described as "Aquila" danana, is of rather unclear affiliations but probably belongs to the same lineage as the above.

Bones indistinguishable from those of living black-chested buzzard-eagles were found in a spring deposit at the Baños de Ciego Montero in Cienfuegos Province, Cuba. A partial left carpometacarpus – Specimen AMNH FR 6190 – as well as a fingerbone probably date from some time in the Pleistocene, during the last ice age. Its contemporary close relatives in Cuba, as far as it is known, consisted of the gigantic eagle-like buteonine hawks which were clearly distinct by size alone, while the Pleistocene record of similar-sized birds from continental North America is from the far west.

== Description ==
This is a huge eagle-like "buzzard" ("hawk" in American terminology). It has a total length of 62 to 76 cm (24 to 30 in) and a wingspan of 149 to 200 cm (4 ft 11 in to 6 ft 7 in). In the nominate race, males averaged 2.13 kg (4.7 lb) and females averaged 2.75 kg (6.1 lb), with a range between both of 1.67 to 3.17 kg (3.7 to 7.0 lb). In the linearly slightly smaller G. m. australis subspecies, a male weighed 1.7 kg (3.7 lb) and a female weighed 3.2 kg (7.1 lb), indicating the bulk of the two races is roughly the same.

It is noted for its bulky, powerful-looking build. It is rather long- and broad-winged and the slightly tapering tail is short by comparison and colored black, with grey tips in fresh plumage. When perched, the wings cover the tail almost completely, giving the bird a unique near-tailess appearance. The adult has a white underside, sometimes with fine blackish stripes; its upperparts are dark grey with a blackish, brownish, or bluish hue. The feathers of the neck and the lowest dark feathers of the breast are somewhat elongated. Adults have an ash-grey-and-white zone on the wings, the silvery white seen clearly from afar. The female is distinguished by a reddish-cinnamon hue to the upper- and underwing secondaries and is considerably larger than the male.

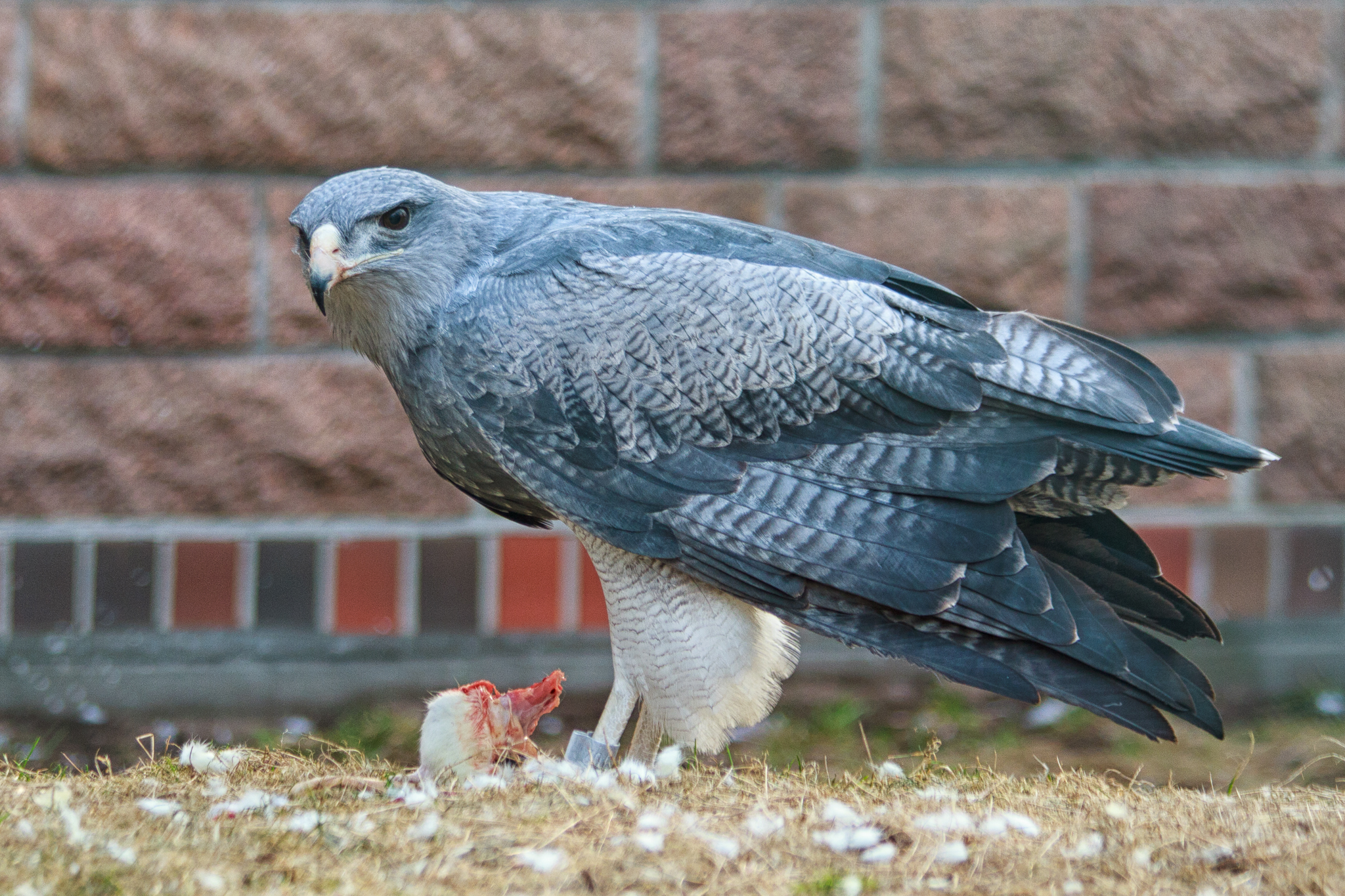
Showing the relatively uniform upperside plumage, at Tierpark Berlin

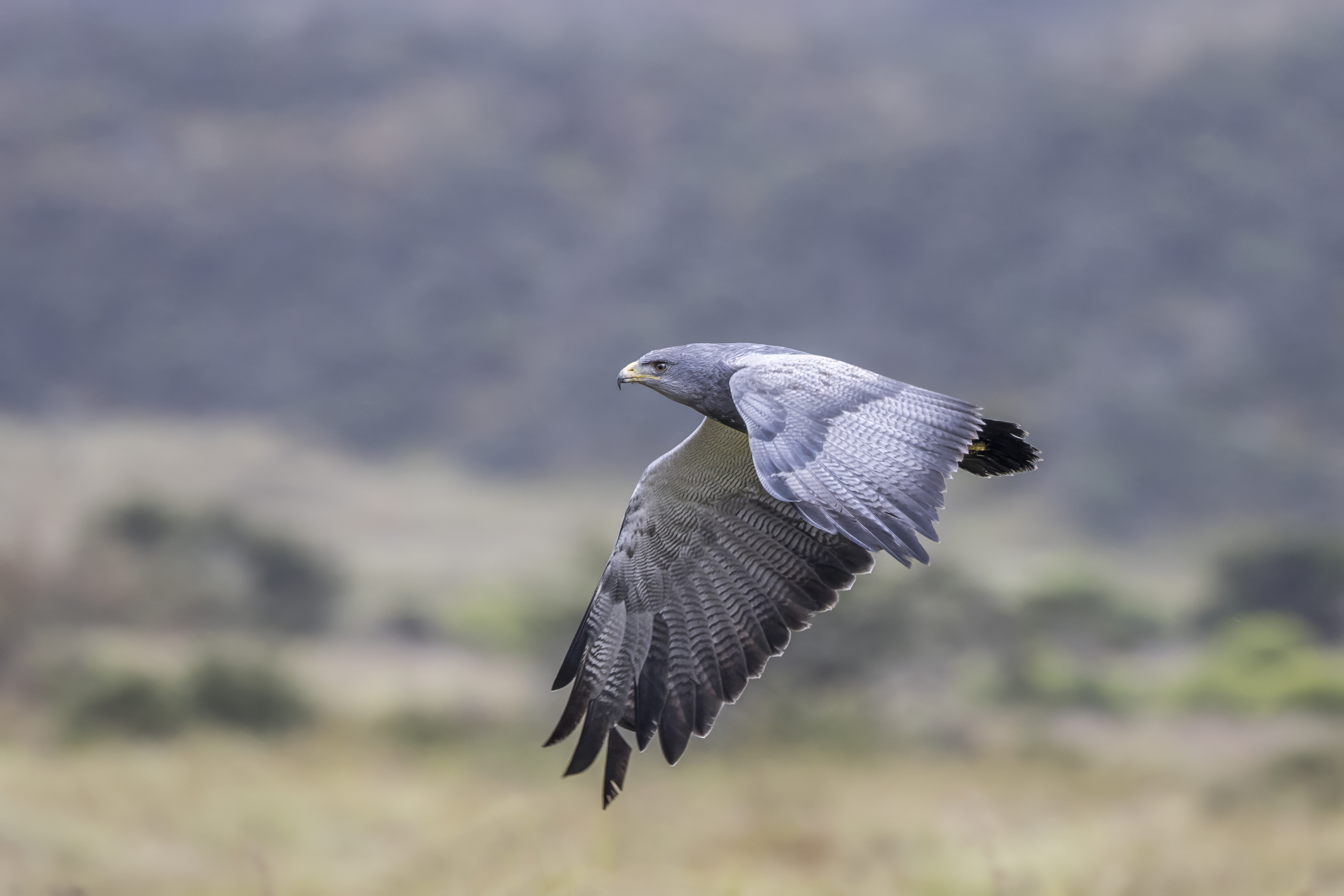
In Chingaza National Natural Park, Colombia

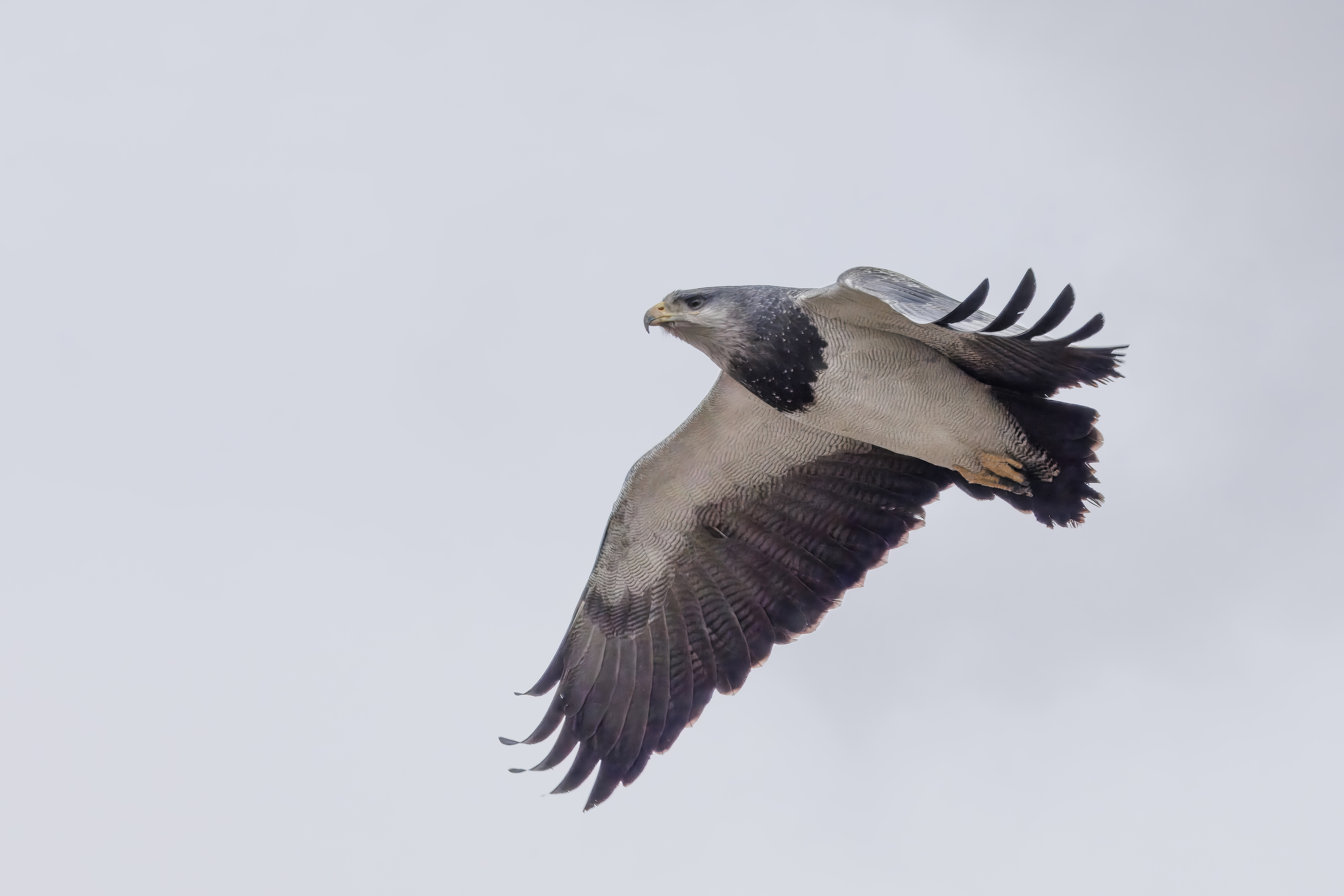
in Chile

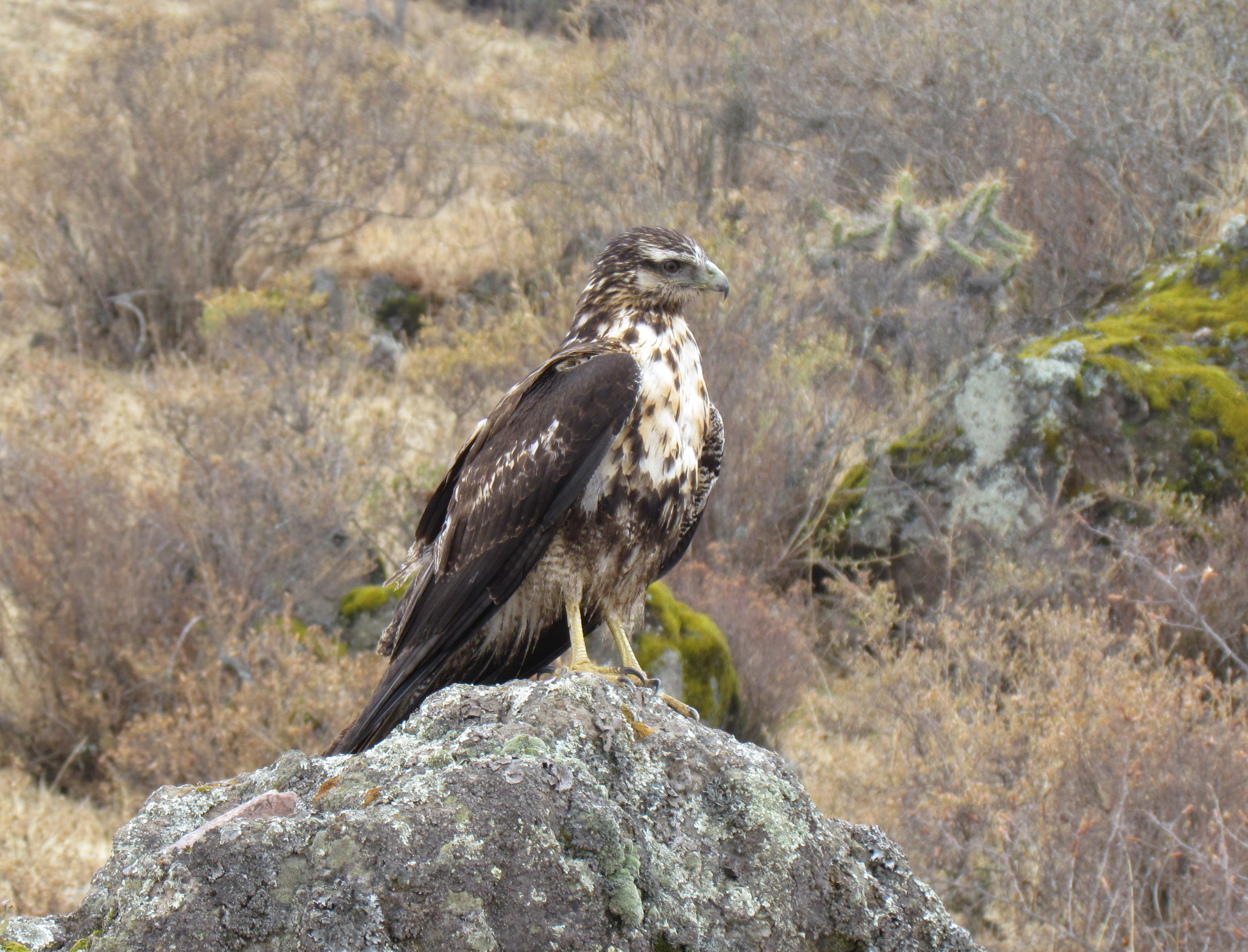
Juvenile, in Peru

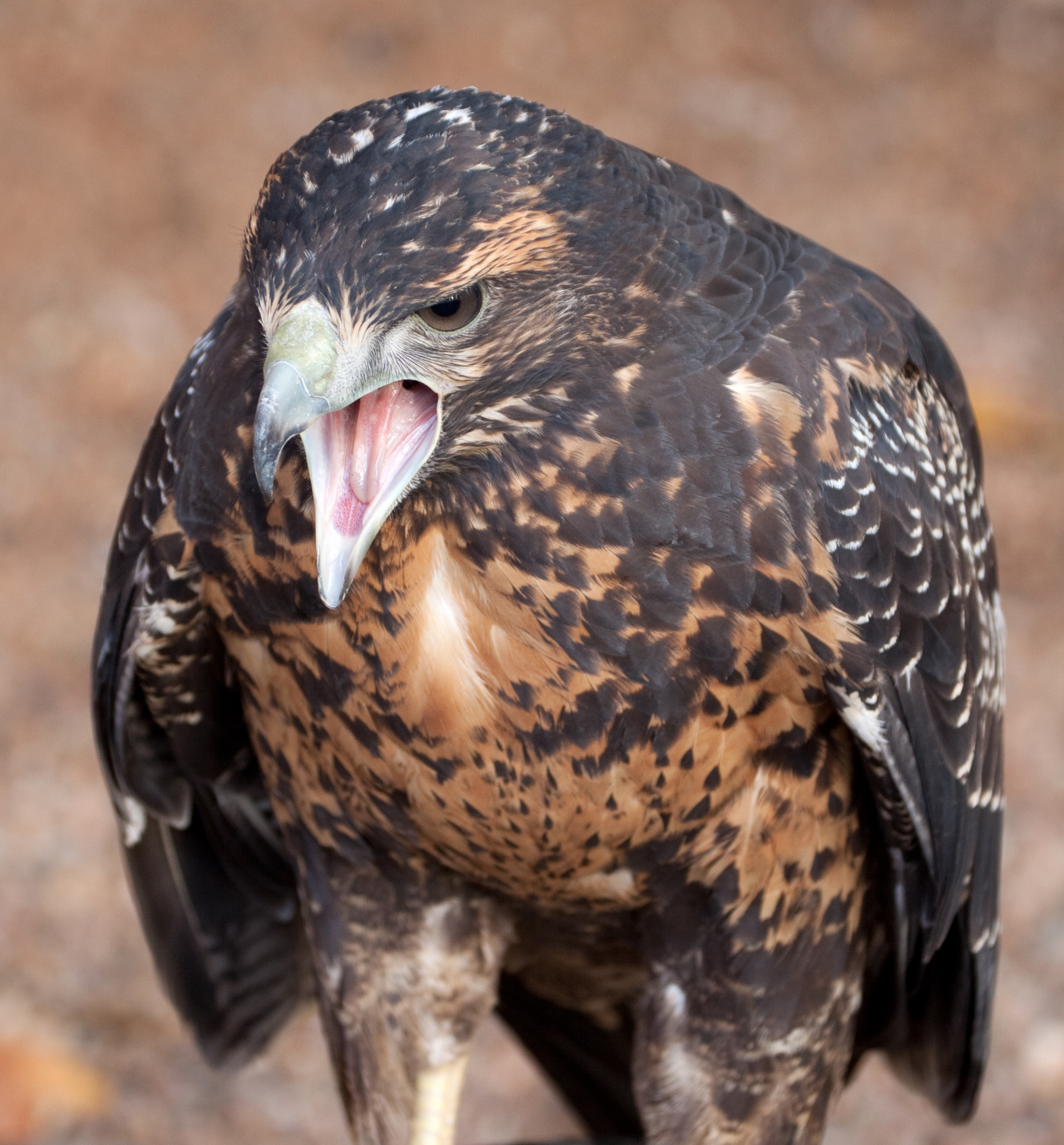
Immature

Among standard measurements, males possess a wing chord of 463 to 555 mm (18.2 to 21.9 in), a tail of 203 to 300 mm (8.0 to 11.8 in), a culmen of 29 to 45 mm (1.1 to 1.8 in) and a tarsus of 95 to 102 mm (3.7 to 4.0 in). In comparison, females have a wing chord of 490 to 566 mm (19.3 to 22.3 in), a tail of 220 to 310 mm (8.7 to 12.2 in), a culmen of 30 to 45 mm (1.2 to 1.8 in) and a tarsus of 89 to 110 mm (3.5 to 4.3 in).

The immature plumage is reminiscent of that of the great black hawk (Buteogallus urubitinga). Its upperparts are deep brown, sometimes almost black, and it has no light wing patch. The underside is white or light buff with heavy dark streaks on the breast and dark bars on the belly and thighs. It does not acquire the full adult plumage until 4–5 years old.

It is not very vocal, calling usually in flight and when close to the nest. Some calls resemble a wild human laugh, others are a curlew-like whistle. Occasionally flying birds give a high-pitched vocalization "kukukukuku".

The black-chested buzzard-eagle is readily identified in flight by its short wedge-shaped tail scarcely protruding from its long, broad wings. It is usually easy to make out the generally white underparts with the dark chest-band and tail if the birds are adult.

== Habitat ==
The black-chested buzzard-eagle is found in mountainous or hilly terrain with sparse vegetation, shrubland, or (in the south of its range) Nothofagus forest, where it spends a lot of time soaring in thermals and vertical drafts while looking for prey. It requires large territories with suitable habitat, the páramos at the north of its range, for example, while providing the latter, fails to provide the former, and thus it has only been recorded in the largest patches of such habitat, such as Páramo de Frontino. Most common between about 5,000 feet (1,500 m) and 15,000 feet (4,600 m) ASL, it rarely ventures into the lowlands.

== Behaviour ==
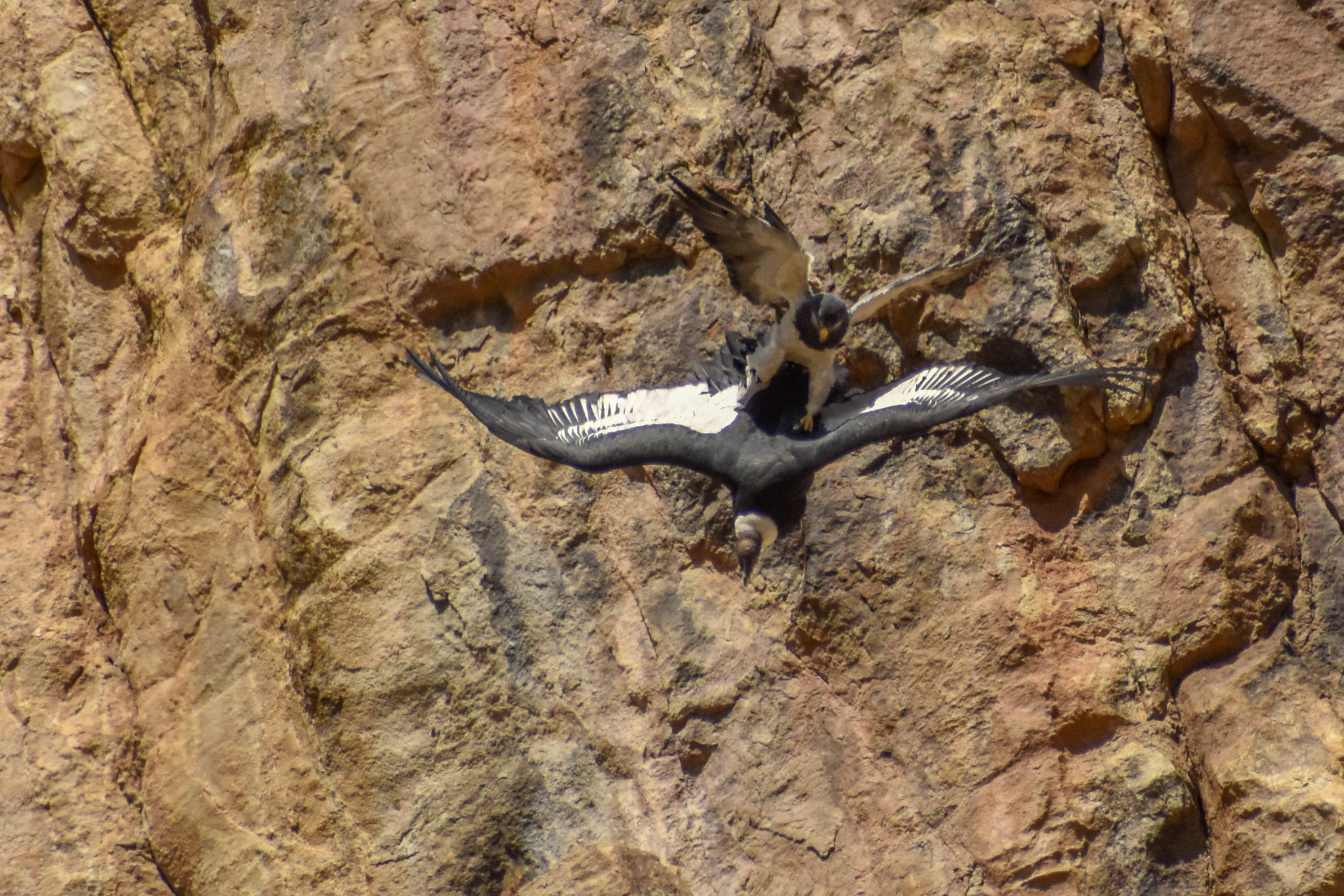
In conflict with an Andean condor, Santa Cruz, Argentina

It is most conspicuous in the mid-morning and afternoon when individuals will seek out places that provide the best soaring conditions, such as north and west-facing slopes and ridges. Apparently, their main interest at these times is aerial play and display; they tend to ignore places where food is more plentiful or easily hunted in favor of simply soaring alone or in pairs in strong air currents.

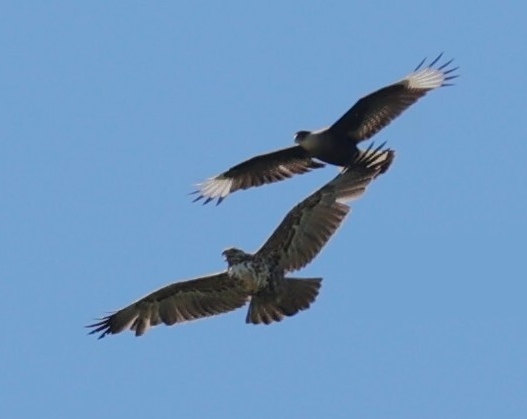
Juvenile (bottom) compared to a crested caracara (top), in Buenos Aires

The food of this carnivore consists mainly of mid-sized mammals; the introduced European rabbit seems to have become a key prey item. The black-chested buzzard-eagle is helpful to farmers by keeping down the numbers of rabbits, which can be serious agricultural pests. Native common degus also take a large part of its diet. Other mammals are also taken such as viscachas and caviid rodents. Occasionally, it will take carnivores such as Humboldt's hog-nosed skunks, lesser grisons and even larger Andes skunks and gray foxes. Its diet is rounded off with an occasional bird. Avian prey species are usually small passerines or rails but carnivorous species like the burrowing owl and sizeable prey such as Penelope guans, buff-necked ibis or the Chilean tinamou are also taken. large squamates, and if need be also arthropods and carrion will be added in their diet. It is near the top of the avian food chain in its range, in part since it is the only Andean eagle found outside forest habitats. It may compete for carrion with the much larger Andean condor.

== Reproduction ==
It nests in high trees or on rocky cliffs, or if these are not available on high trees or even cacti. If no appropriate high place is available this species will nest in bushes or even on the ground. In Ecuador, nesting can be observed all year round; elsewhere it might have a more restricted breeding season but the information is scant and somewhat contradictory. The nest is a huge mass of sticks about 85 centimetres (33 in) in diameter; the black-chested buzzard-eagle is just as likely to reuse an existing nest as to build a new one, and several abandoned nests are often found in the vicinity of an active one. The male and female engage in courtship flights and copulate over a prolonged time of several weeks as the pairs bond. Little is known of the actual nesting; the clutch contains usually 2 but sometimes 1 or 3 eggs, which are incubated for about a month. The nestlings presumably are covered in white down like in its relatives. While not aggressive under normal circumstances, the black-chested eagle-buzzard will fiercely attack humans if it considers itself or its offspring threatened.

== Conservation ==
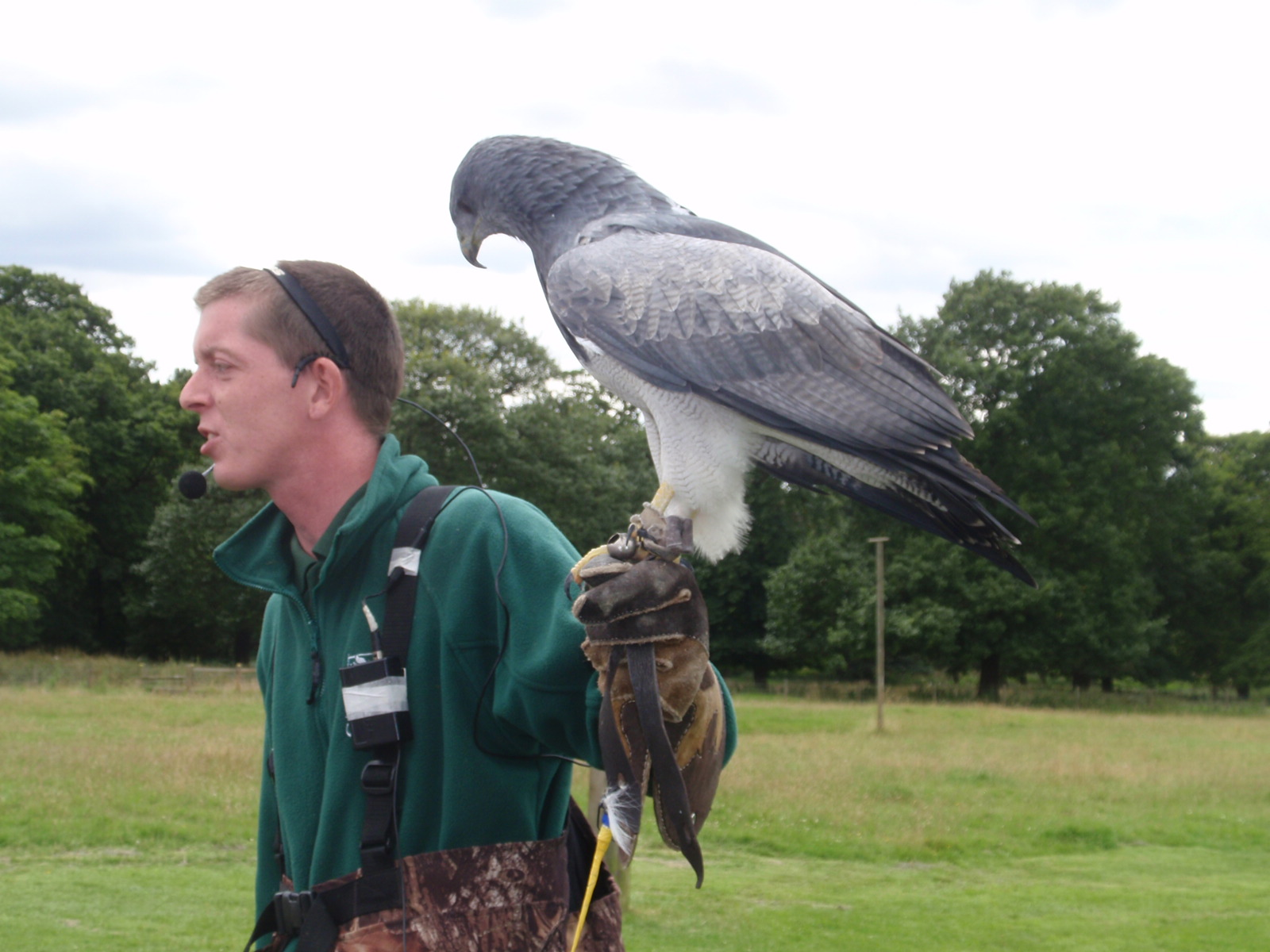
Chilean blue eagle at Knowsley

Owing the wide overall range Geranoaetus melanoleucus is considered a species of Least Concern by the IUCN.

While it is rare and declining in places – e.g. in Rio Grande do Sul and Santa Catarina states in Brazil, or in parts of Argentina – its habitat requirements mean that it will to some degree benefit from deforestation and it has for example colonized regions of the former Mata Atlântica forest in Alagoas. The declines in Argentina have been attributed to poisoning by strychnine baits deployed by sheep farmers trying to eradicate pests.
