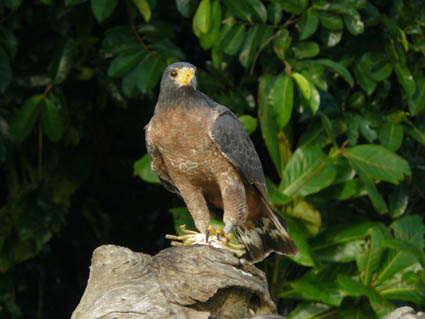

Conservation status
- Near Threatened (IUCN 3.1)

Scientific classification
- Kingdom: Animalia
- Phylum: Chordata
- Class: Aves
- Order: Accipitriformes
- Family: Accipitridae
- Genus: Buteogallus
- Species: B. aequinoctialis

Binomial name
- Buteogallus aequinoctialis (Gmelin, JF, 1788)

= Rufous crab hawk =

Species of bird

The rufous crab hawk (Buteogallus aequinoctialis) or rufous crab-hawk, is a Near Threatened species of bird of prey in subfamily Accipitrinae, the "true" hawks, of family Accipitridae. It is found on Trinidad and along the South American coastline from eastern Venezuela to southern Brazil.

== Taxonomy and systematics ==
The rufous crab hawk was formally described in 1788 by the German naturalist Johann Friedrich Gmelin in his revised and expanded edition of Carl Linnaeus's Systema Naturae. He placed it with the eagles, hawks and relatives in the genus Falco and coined the binomial name Falco aequinoctialis. Gmelin based his description on the "Aequinoctial eagle" that had been described in 1781 by the English ornithologist John Latham from a specimen that formed part of a private collection in London. The specimen had come from Cayenne. The rufous crab hawk is now one of nine species placed in the genus Buteogallus that was introduced in 1830 by the French naturalist René Lesson. The genus name is a portmanteau of the genus name Buteo introduced in 1779 by Bernard Germain de Lacépède for the buzzards and the genus Gallus introduced in 1760 by Mathurin Jacques Brisson for the junglefowl. The specific epithet aequinoctialis is from Latin meaning "equinoctial". The species is monotypic: no subspecies are recognized.

== Description ==
The rufous crab hawk is 42.5 to 46 cm (17 to 18 in) in overall length with a 90 to 106 cm (35 to 42 in) wingspan. Males weigh 506 to 665 g (18 to 23 oz); females are heavier and weigh around 725 to 945 g (26 to 33 oz). Males and females have the same plumage. Adults' head, throat, and neck are sooty black and their back is dark rufous with light rufous edging. Their underparts are rufous with fine dark barring. The tail is black with a white tip and a thin white band. Their eyes are brown and their cere and feet are yellow to dusky orange. Immatures have brown to blackish brown upperparts, a grayish tail, and white underparts with dusky streaks.

== Distribution and habitat ==
The rufous crab hawk is found on Trinidad and on the South American mainland along the coast from the Orinoco Delta in Venezuela through the Guianas and into Brazil as far as the southeastern state of Paraná. It primarily inhabits mangroves but also occurs in swamps, wet savanna, and river edges near the coast, all essentially at sea level.

== Behavior ==
=== Movement ===
The rufous crab hawk is sedentary and usually seen in pairs.

=== Feeding ===
The rufous crab hawk's diet is mostly, and possibly entirely, crabs (e.g. Callinectes and Ucides). It catches them with a short dive from a low perch; it typically takes them to a favored site like a stump to consume them.

=== Breeding ===
The rufous crab hawk makes a "sky-dance" display; it is suspected that only the male performs it. Its breeding season varies geographically, for example between February and August in Suriname and apparently from September onward in southeastern Brazil. It makes a nest of twigs lined with leaves in a mangrove or other tree near water. The clutch size is usually one egg though sometimes two are laid. The incubation period and time to fledging are not known.

=== Vocalization ===
The rufous crab hawk's call is "a loud rather shrill whistle or laugh...'ke-kee-kee-kee-kew-kew'".

== Status ==
The IUCN originally assessed the rufous crab hawk as being of Least Concern but since 2013 has classed it as Near Threatened. Its population size is not known and is believed to be decreasing. Ongoing destruction of its mangrove habitat is the principal threat. It varies from rare to fairly common in indifferent parts of its range. Its "restricted habitat makes it highly susceptible locally to any form of deterioration or loss of this habitat" but "this species may tolerate some mangrove disturbance and is found in suburban mangrove swamps in Pará, Brazil."
