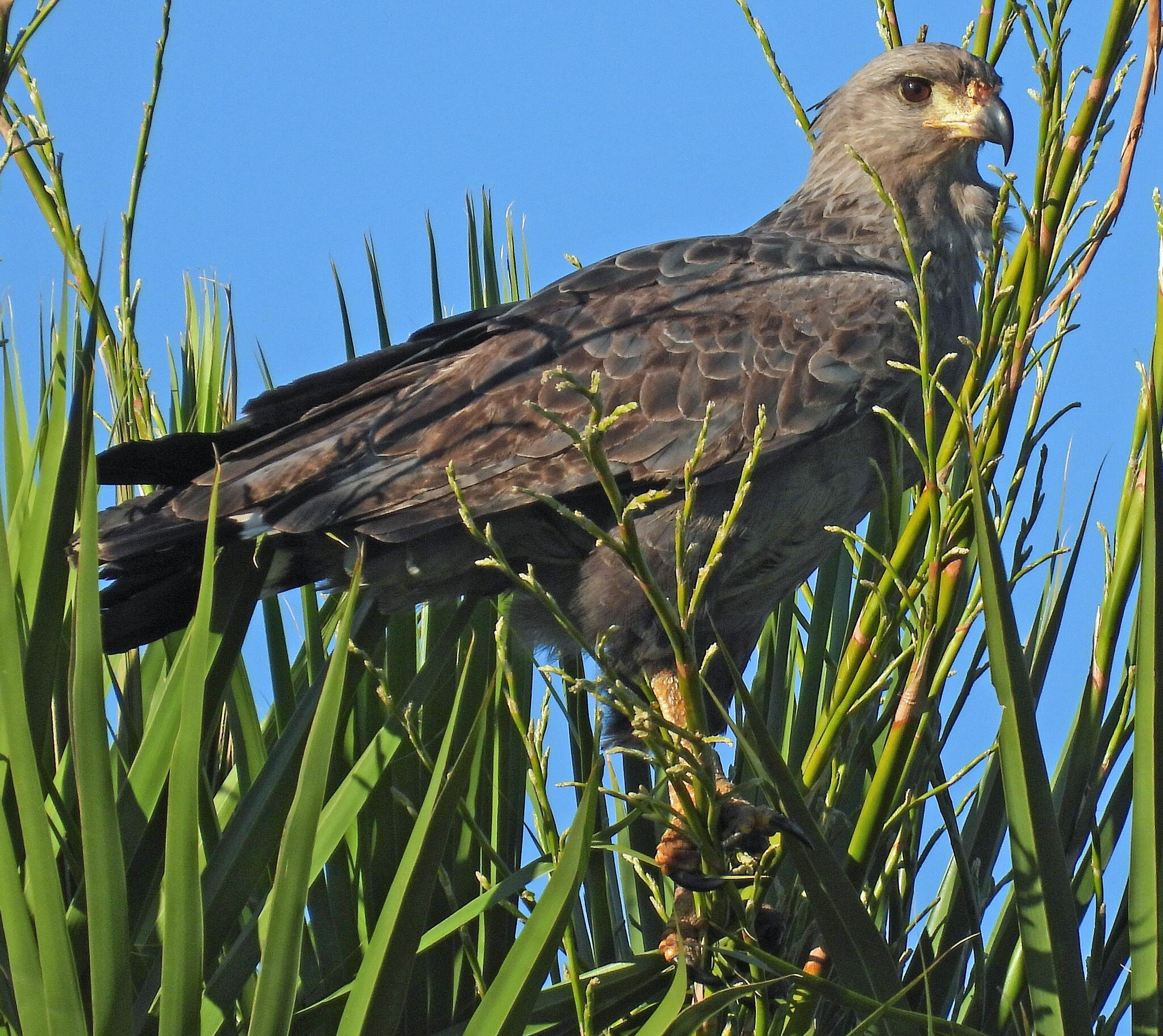

Conservation status
- Endangered (IUCN 3.1)

Scientific classification
- Kingdom: Animalia
- Phylum: Chordata
- Class: Aves
- Order: Accipitriformes
- Family: Accipitridae
- Genus: Buteogallus
- Species: B. coronatus

Binomial name
- Buteogallus coronatus (Vieillot, 1817)

Synonyms
- Harpyhaliaetus coronatus

= Chaco eagle =

Species of bird

The Chaco eagle (Buteogallus coronatus) or crowned solitary eagle, is an endangered bird of prey from eastern and central South America. Typically it is known simply as the crowned eagle, which leads to potential confusion with the African Stephanoaetus coronatus. Due to its rarity, not much is known about its biology or population.

== Description ==
The Chaco eagle is a large raptor with a mostly dull and silvery grey body plumage. Its short black tail has a broad white medial band as well as a white tip and both its cere and legs are yellow. As its name indicates, the Crowned Solitary Eagle has a crest of darker grey feathers. The juvenile also has a crest but its colour dark brown, except for it creamy head and underbody which are both have grey streaks. It is one of the largest raptors in the Neotropics and normally weighs around 2.95 kg (6.5 lb). Its total length can reach 73–79 cm (29–31 in) and it has a wingspan of 170–183 cm (5 ft 7 in – 6 ft 0 in).

== Taxonomy ==
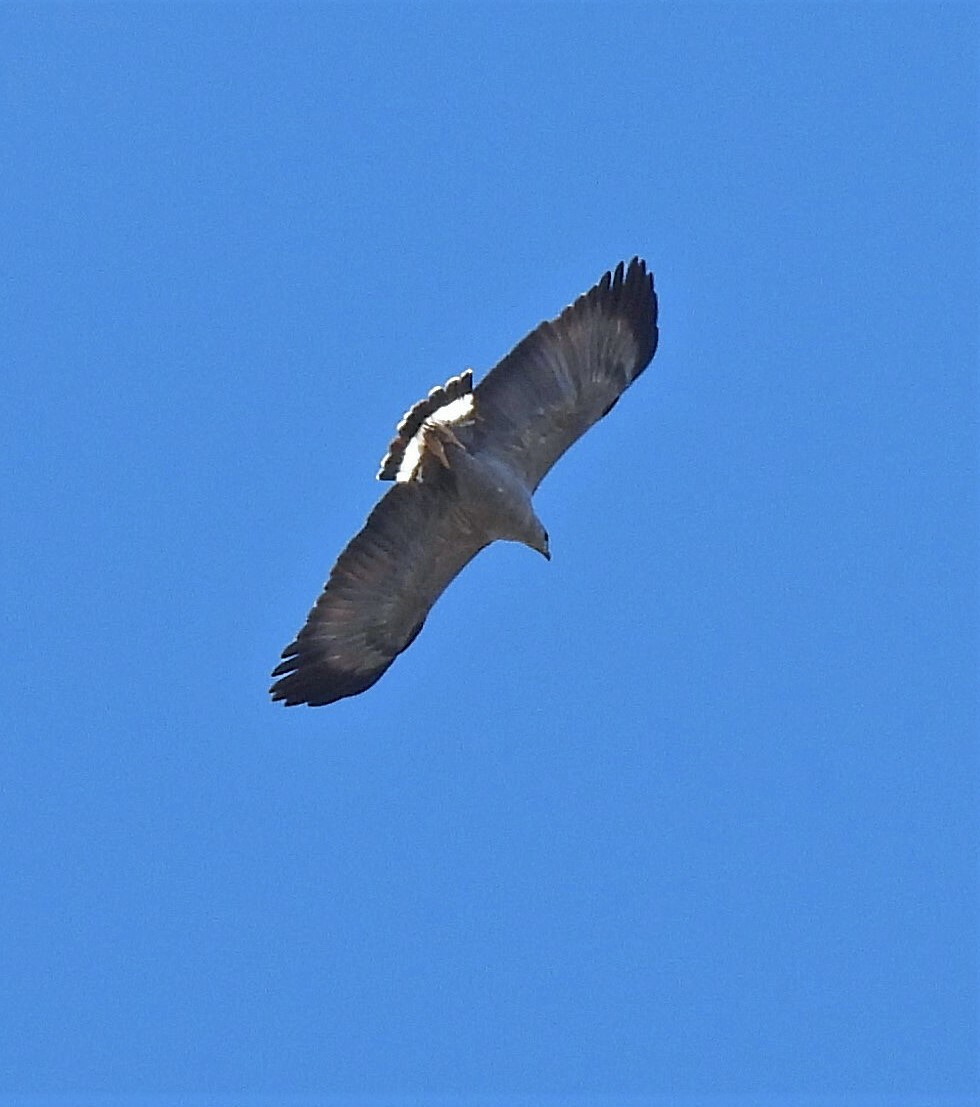
A Chaco eagle in flight, showing the distinctive tail pattern; Santa Fe, Argentina.

Buteogallus coronatus is monotypic, with no subspecies. Vieillot first named it Harpyia coronata in 1817. It was subsequently reclassified by Lafresnaye in 1842 in the genus Harpyphaliatus, as Harpyhaliatus coronatus. At the time, the Solitary eagle (now Buteogallus solitarius) was considered to be a subspecies of Harpyhaliatus coronatus, until phylogenetic analyses of their DNA showed that they are, in fact, sister species. These analyses also indicated that another species, the Great black hawk (Buteogallus anthracinus), is also a sister species. They were all reclassified in the genus Buteogallus.

== Habitat and distribution ==
=== Distribution ===
This bird is endemic to eastern and central South America, where it is present in southern and central Brazil, Bolivia, Paraguay and in Argentina south to northern Patagonia. The status of the Chaco Eagle is uncertain in Uruguay, where it has not been seen for decades and is believed to be extinct. It has become regionally extinct in portions of its historical range, and is found in very low density throughout its range, making it one of the rarest and most threatened raptors in the Neotropical region. Only 250-999 mature individuals are left, while the total individual count of the species reaches 375-1499 birds.

=== Habitat ===
The Chaco Eagle can be found in semi open habitats such as open mixed grasslands, brushlands, savannahs, marshes and open woodlands. Also, the presence of large trees in the habitat is very important for the Chaco eagle since they are used for nesting.

=== Threats ===
The Chaco Eagle is considered endangered. Its population is declining, a trend that is most likely due to human activities. The Chaco Eagle populations are affected by many threats, including habitat degradation, collisions with human structures, and persecution. An example of the latter would be in Argentina, where Chaco Eagles are still killed due to the belief that they attack livestock. Between 1999 and 2014, 30 Chaco Eagles were brought to a rehabilitation center after they had been shot to protect livestock. For such a small population, this can have a great impact on the species' chances at survival. This persecution attracted the attention of conservation groups, which lead to the creation of a national plan of plan of conservation for the Chaco Eagle in Argentina, the only country to do so so far. Another important factor is the electrocution of Chaco Eagles by power poles, which also has a sizeable impact on their populations. This is also a common problem that unfortunately affects many raptors.

== Behavior ==
Often seen in solitary pairs or small groups of three, the Chaco Eagle is a tame crepuscular species that forages during early hours.

=== Vocalization ===
The Chaco Eagle can be recognized by its very powerful and shrill whistling call that can be heard 2 km away.

=== Diet ===
Chaco Eagles still-hunt from perches. Its diet consists mostly of small to medium size mammals. It primarily preys on armadillos such as pichis (Zaedyus pichiy) and nine-banded armadillos (Dasypus novemcinctus) as well as Andes skunks (Conepatus chinga). But other mammals such as rodents, possums, European hares (Lepus europaeus), and lesser grisons (Galictis cuja) are also taken. Reptiles such as snakes, tortoises, and lizards also make up a smaller part of their diet. When hunting snakes, the eagles often remove the head first. Singular scales on the eagle's tarsus protected them from snake bites. Small lizards are caught directly with talons, but large lizards such as red tegus (Salvator rufescens) and Argentine black and white tegus (Tupinambis merianae) are captured by approaching them from the side, grabbing them by the hip with one foot and then by the head with the other, apparently to reduce the risk of being bitten or whipped by the tail. Normally, this raptor kills or hunts its prey, but some individuals have been seen eating dead deer, sheep, armadillos, and roadkill.

=== Reproduction ===
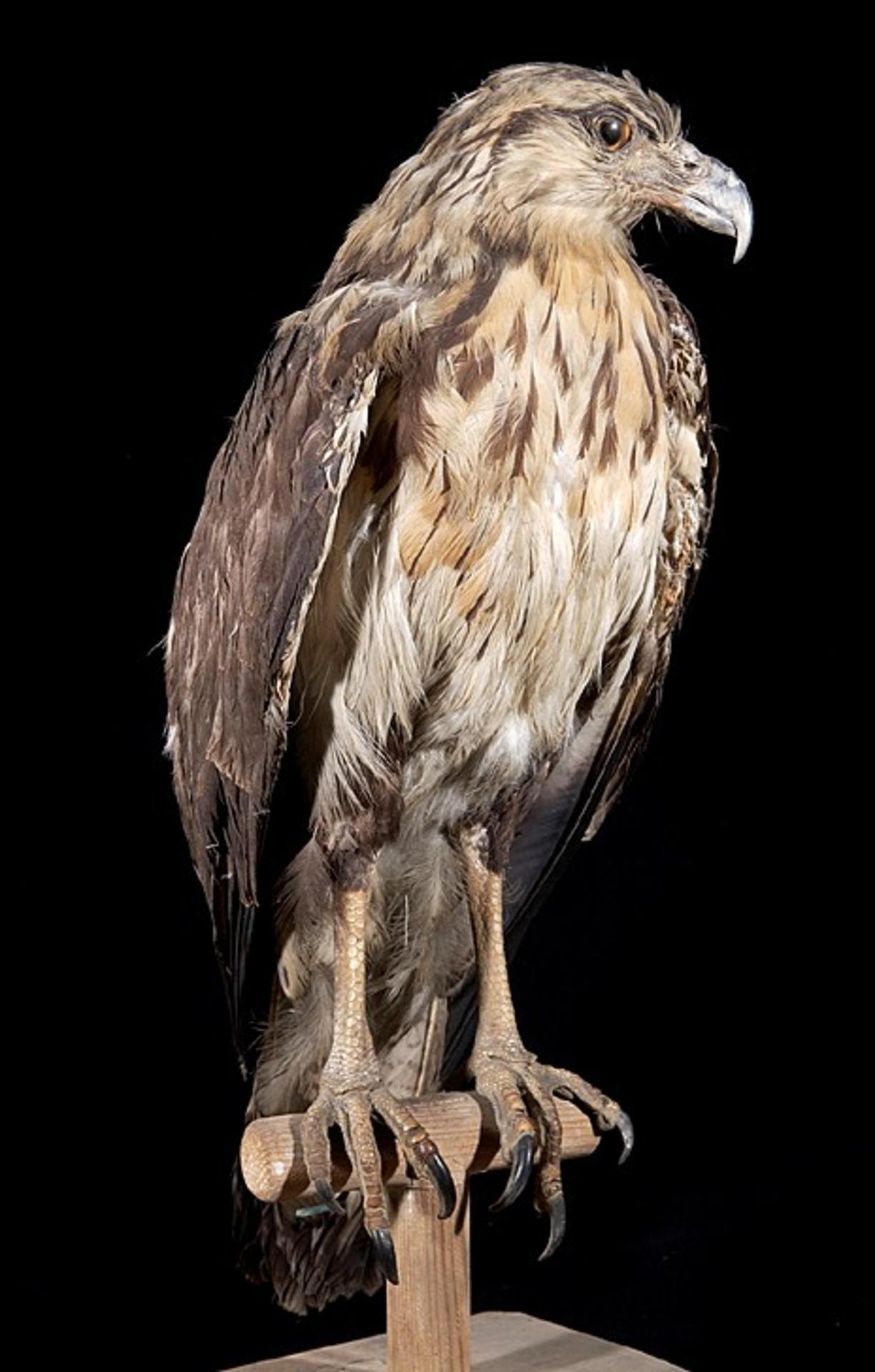
A mounted specimen of a juvenile Chaco eagle.

The Chaco Eagle is a monogamous species. Between August and October, a single white egg with grey spots is laid on a platform-like nest of sticks and leaves. The nest is constructed on the tallest trees of breeding territories, 10-13m above ground. Some eagles have been seen nesting on human made buildings in area where no trees were available. The egg hatches around 45 days after it was laid (November–December). The female stays near its offspring from the moment the egg is laid until the chick is old enough to be left alone for short periods of time. The male continuously brings food to the nest, while the female joins the hunting when the chick hatches and grows a bit. The offspring will stay in the nest for 65–70 days. Not much is known concerning the age of breeding, but it is estimated that they do not breed before they reach 3–5 years of age.
