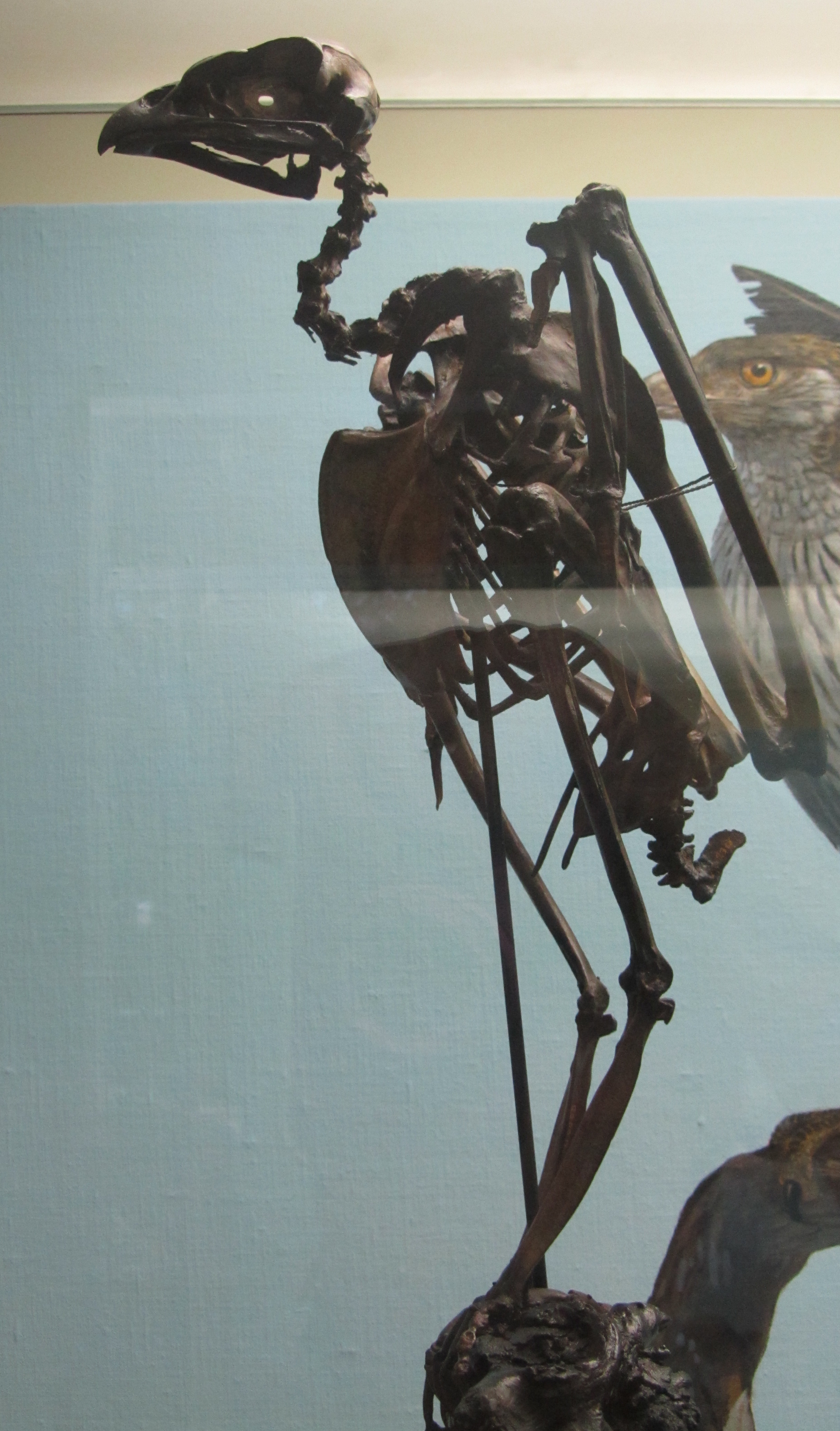
- Skeleton from the La Brea Tar Pits

Scientific classification
- Kingdom: Animalia
- Phylum: Chordata
- Class: Aves
- Order: Accipitriformes
- Family: Accipitridae
- Genus: Buteogallus
- Species: †B. fragilis

Binomial name
- †Buteogallus fragilis Miller, 1911

Synonyms
- Urubitinga fragilis

= Buteogallus fragilis =

Buteogallus fragilis Temporal range: Late Pleistocene

Extinct species of bird

Buteogallus fragilis, sometimes called the fragile eagle, is an extinct species of bird of prey that lived in North America during the Late Pleistocene. Remains of 83 individuals have been found in the La Brea Tar Pits in California, and the species has also been reported from Shelter Cave in New Mexico. It is similar in proportions to the common black hawk.
