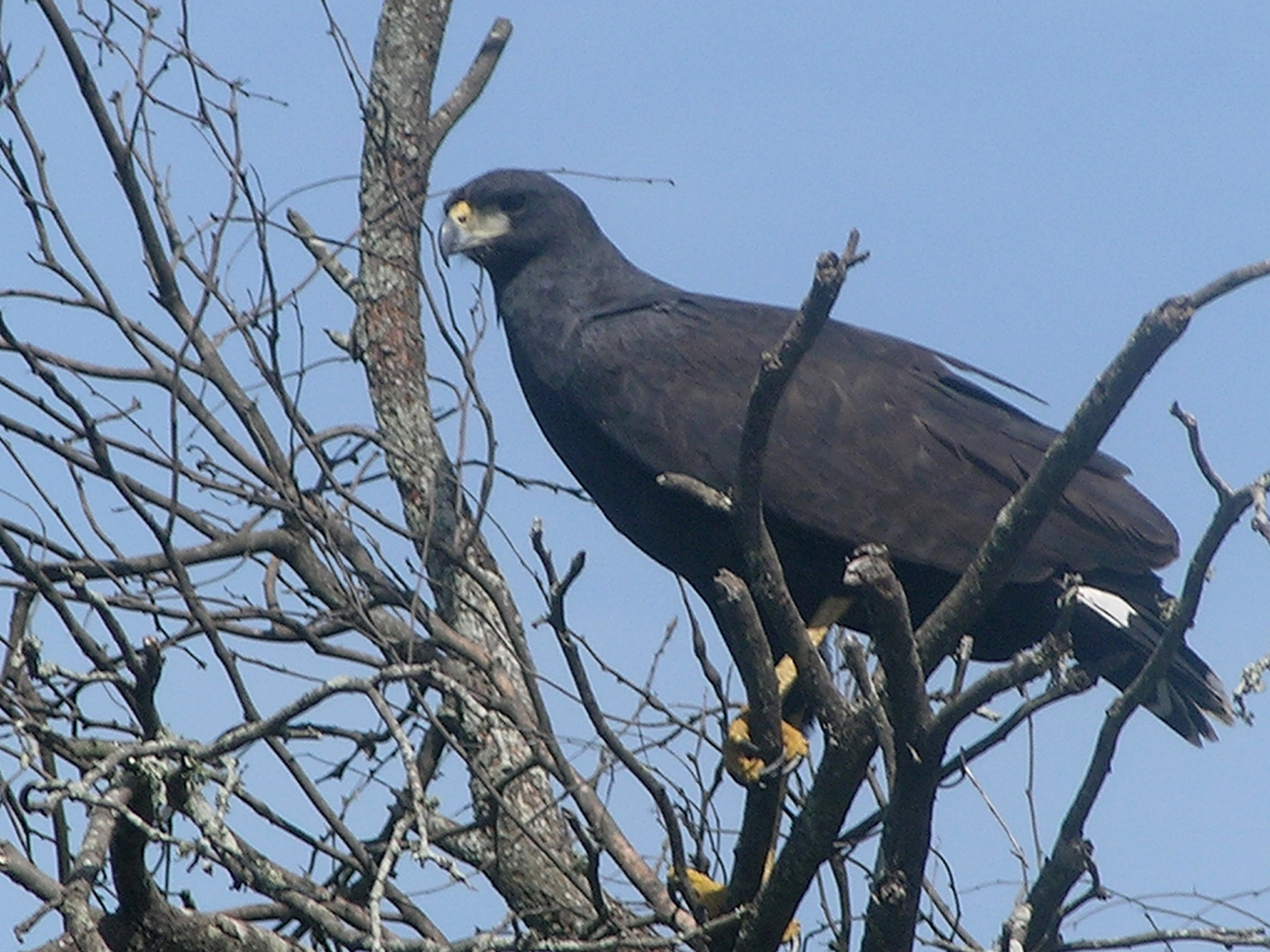
- Great black hawk (Buteogallus urubitinga)

Scientific classification
- Kingdom: Animalia
- Phylum: Chordata
- Class: Aves
- Order: Accipitriformes
- Family: Accipitridae
- Subfamily: Buteoninae
- Genus: Buteogallus; Lesson, RP, 1830

Type species
- Buteogallus cathartoides = Falco aequinoctialis Lesson, 1830

Species
- see text

Synonyms
- Alectromorphnus Heine & Reichenow, [1890] Heterospizias; Harpyhaliaetus; Wetmoregyps; Amplibuteo

= Buteogallus =

Buteogallus Temporal range: Middle Miocene to present

Genus of birds

Buteogallus is a genus of birds of prey in the family Accipitridae. All members of this genus are essentially neotropical, but the distribution of a single species extends slightly into the southwestern United States. Many of the species are fond of large crustaceans and even patrol long stretches of shore or riverbank on foot where such prey abounds, but some have a rather different lifestyle. Unlike many other genera of raptor, some members are referred to as "hawks", and others as "eagles".

Most of the species have a characteristic tail pattern. This consists of a black base, a wide white middle band, a wide black band, and a quite narrow white band on the feathertips that is often hard to discern or may be lost when the feathers are very worn. Only the white-necked hawk and the rufous crab hawk have a very different tail patterns (see also below).

== Taxonomy ==
The genus Buteogallus was introduced in 1830 by the French naturalist René Lesson to accommodate the rufous crab hawk, which is therefore the type species. The name is a portmanteau of the genus name Buteo introduced in 1779 by Bernard Germain de Lacépède for the buzzards, and the genus Gallus introduced in 1760 by Mathurin Jacques Brisson for the junglefowl. The genus now contains nine species.

Harpyhaliaetus is a former genus of eagles described by Frédéric de Lafresnaye in 1842. Two species were recognized: Harpyhaliaetus coronatus and Harpyhaliaetus solitarius. However, more recent studies have led to this genus being merged into Buteogallus.

== Species ==
The solitary eagles (formerly Harpyhaliaetus) are a more inland relative of the "black-hawk" group of Buteogallus – in phenotype they are essentially hefty common black-hawks with lighter body plumage and in one species a small crest. Insofar as there are differences in anatomy, these seem to be related to the different prey they hunt (namely reptiles). Together with the savanna hawk, they seem to be close to some species that were uncomfortably placed in Leucopternis. As that genus was apparently polyphyletic, the present article follows a proposal to unite the solitary eagles as well as the slate-colored hawk ("Leucopternis" schistaceus) with Buteogallus, to agree with the morphological and mtDNA sequence data., with the addition of the white-necked hawk, "Leucopternis" lacernulatus.

For a long time various systematists have proposed moving the slate-colored hawk to Buteogallus. Together with the crab hawks and solitary eagles form a sequence of plumage patterns that nicely agrees with the DNA-based phylogeny: the slate-colored hawk looks very much like a smaller, shorter-legged and lighter common black hawk. The case of the white-necked hawk is more puzzling. It is visually and ecologically almost identical to the sympatric mantled hawk (Leucopternis polionotus) and some allopatric white hawks (L. albicollis) but differs in tail color. According to the mtDNA data, it is very closely related to the savanna hawk, which is visually dissimilar, appearing like a very light Buteogallus which has an ochre-grey coloration due to abundant pheomelanins. Either there has been strong convergent evolution in plumage and ecology – perhaps a case of mimicry – between the white-necked and the mantled hawks, or the mtDNA data is misleading due to ancient hybrid introgression. In the respect, the white-necked hawk specimen sampled showed indications of heteroplasmy.

The placement of the peculiarly apomorphic rufous crab hawk in regard to all these birds must be considered unresolved for the time being.

Genus Buteogallus – Lesson, RP, 1830 – nine species
Common name	Scientific name and subspecies	Range	Size and ecology	IUCN status and estimated population
Slate-colored hawk	Buteogallus schistaceus (Sundevall, 1850)	Brazil, Bolivia, Peru, Ecuador, Colombia, Venezuela, and French Guiana	Size: Habitat: Diet:	LC
White-necked hawk	Buteogallus lacernulatus (Temminck, 1827)	Brazil	Size: Habitat: Diet:	VU
Rufous crab hawk	Buteogallus aequinoctialis (Gmelin, JF, 1788)	eastern Venezuela, Trinidad and Tobago to southern Brazil	Size: Habitat: Diet:	NT
Common black hawk	Buteogallus anthracinus (Deppe, 1830) Five subspecies: B. a. anthracinus – (Deppe, 1830); B. a. utilensis – Twomey, 1956; B. a. rhizophorae – Monroe, 1963; B. a. bangsi – (Swann, 1922); B. a. subtilis – (Thayer & Bangs, 1905)	Southwestern United States through Central America to Venezuela, Peru, Trinidad, and the Lesser Antilles	Size: Habitat: Diet:	LC
Cuban black hawk	Buteogallus gundlachii (Cabanis, 1855)	Cuba	Size: Habitat: Diet:	NT
Great black hawk	Buteogallus urubitinga (Gmelin, JF, 1788) Two subspecies: B. u. ridgwayi – (Gurney Sr, 1884); B. u. urubitinga – (Gmelin, JF, 1788)	Mexico through Central America to Peru, Tobago and northern Argentina.	Size: Habitat: Diet:	LC
Savanna hawk	Buteogallus meridionalis (Latham, 1790)	Panama and Trinidad south to Bolivia, Uruguay and central Argentina	Size: Habitat: Diet:	LC
Chaco eagle	Buteogallus coronatus (Vieillot, 1817)	southern and central Brazil, Bolivia, Paraguay and its range extends to Northern Patagonia in Argentina	Size: Habitat: Diet:	EN
Solitary eagle	Buteogallus solitarius (Tschudi, 1844) Two subspecies: B. s. sheffleri – (Van Rossem, 1948); B. s. solitarius – (Tschudi, 1844)	Mexico and Central and South America	Size: Habitat: Diet:	LC

=== Fossil record ===
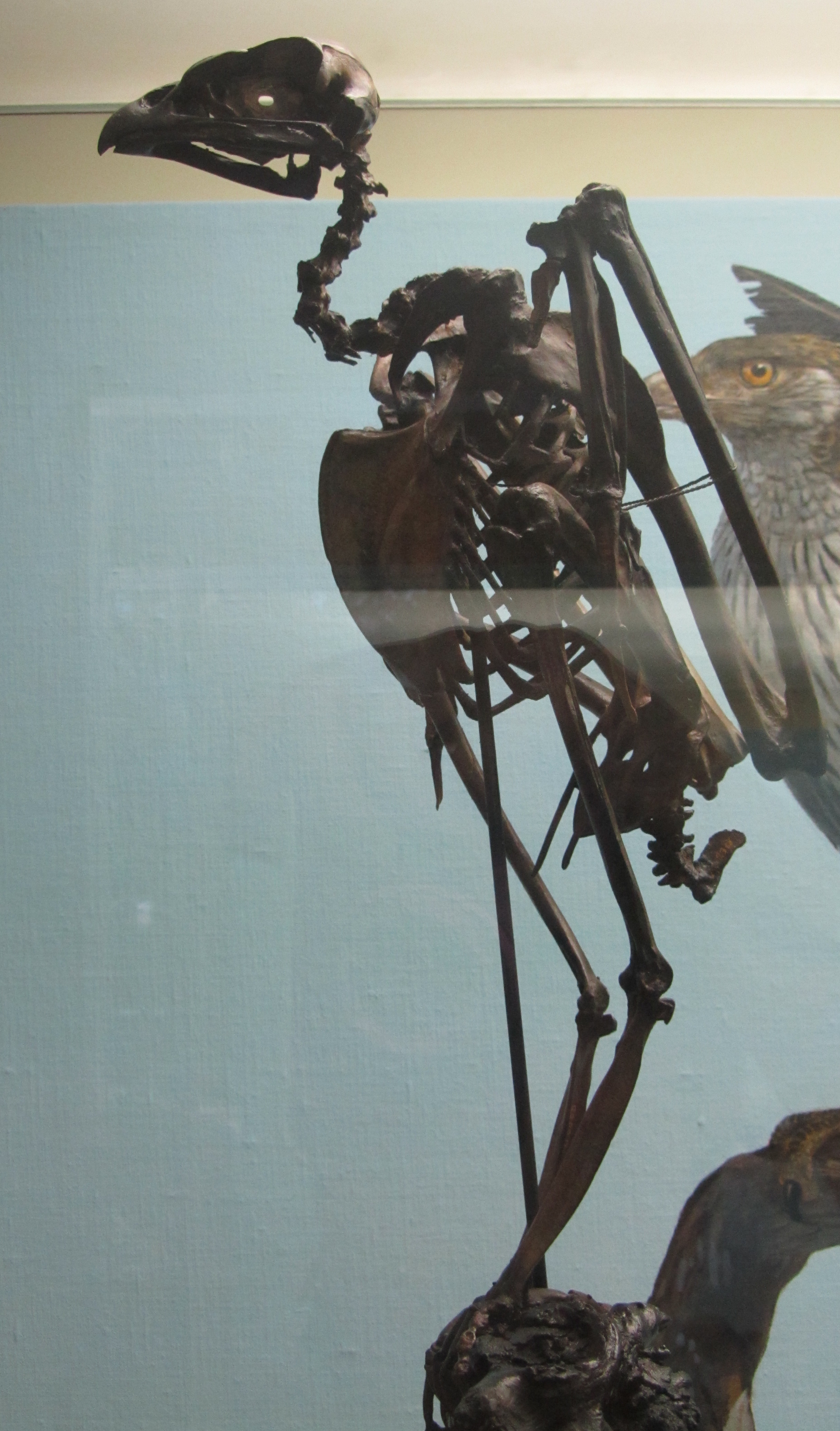
Buteogallus fragilis fossil

The fossil record of Buteogallus has meanwhile turned out to be quite rich indeed, with many species being erroneously assigned to other genera at first. The genus – like many buteonines of today – probably succeeded earlier birds of prey during the Miocene and never seems to have occurred outside the Americas. From the time of the last ice age, an array of prehistoric species is known, some of them very large. On Cuba, a particularly gigantic species survived deep into the last ice age, but probably not until human settlement.

- †Buteogallus enectus (Middle Miocene; Sheep Creek, Sioux County, USA)
- †Buteogallus sodalis (Middle Pleistocene; Fossil Lake, Oregon) – formerly in Aquila
- †Buteogallus fragilis (Late Pleistocene; Southwestern USA) – formerly in Buteo or Geranoaetus
- †Buteogallus milleri (Late Pleistocene of Southwestern USA) – formerly in Buteo or Geranoaetus
- †Buteogallus royi (Late Pleistocene of Cuba)
- †Buteogallus borrasi (prehistoric) – formerly in Aquila or Titanohierax
- †Buteogallus daggetti (prehistoric)
- †Buteogallus woodwardi (Late Pleistocene, Southwestern USA) – formerly in Amplibuteo
- †Buteogallus hibbardi (Late Pleistocene, Peru) – formerly in Amplibuteo
- †Buteogallus concordatus (Late Pliocene of Florida) – formerly in Amplibuteo
- †Buteogallus irpus (Late Pleistocene of Cuba and Dominican Republic)
