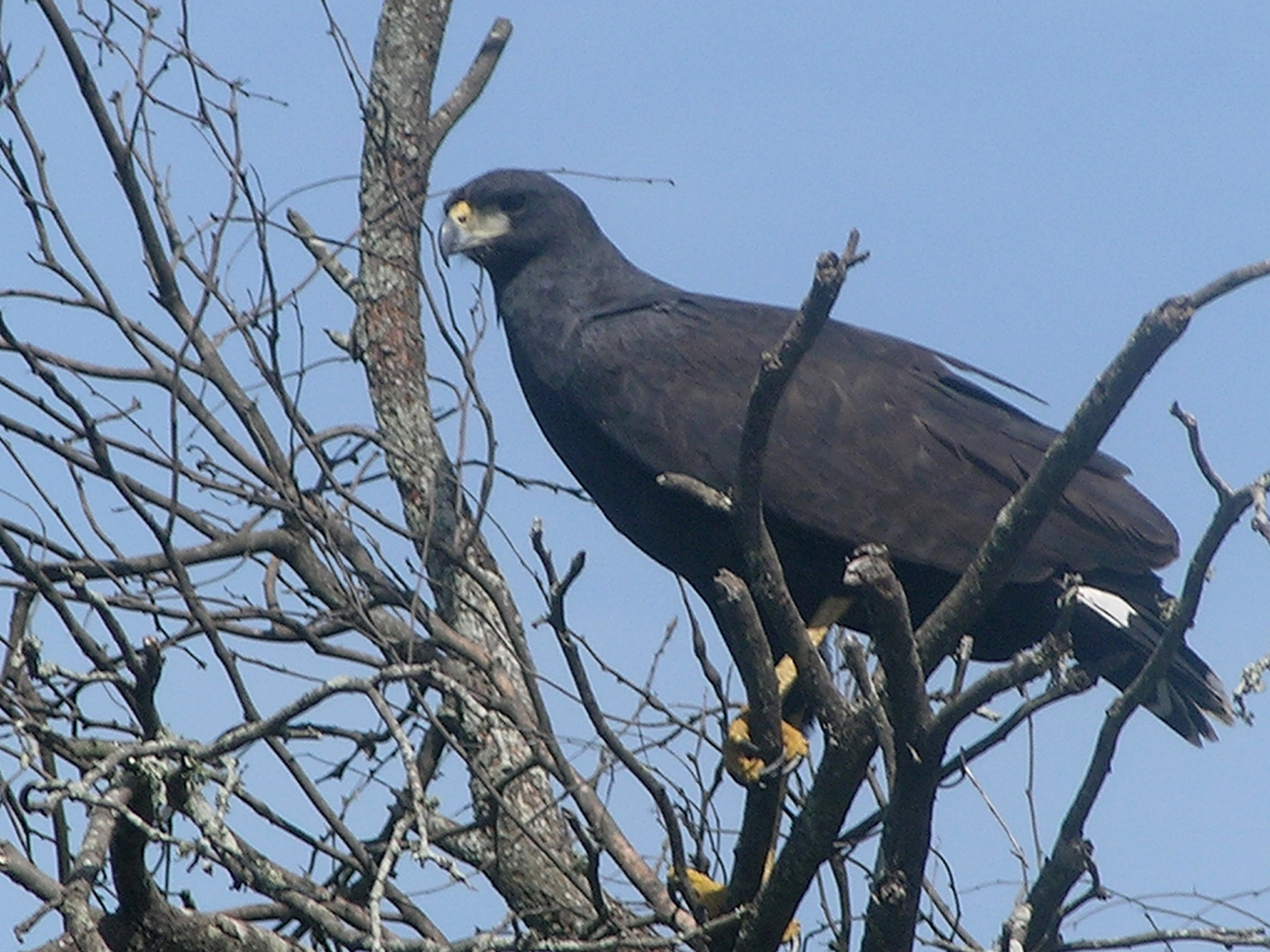

Conservation status
- Least Concern (IUCN 3.1)

Scientific classification
- Kingdom: Animalia
- Phylum: Chordata
- Class: Aves
- Order: Accipitriformes
- Family: Accipitridae
- Genus: Buteogallus
- Species: B. urubitinga

Binomial name
- Buteogallus urubitinga (Gmelin, JF, 1788)

Subspecies
- B. u. ridgwayi - (Gurney Sr, 1884); B. u. urubitinga - (Gmelin, JF, 1788)

= Great black hawk =

Species of bird

The great black hawk (Buteogallus urubitinga) is a bird of prey in the family Accipitridae, which also includes the eagles, hawks, and Old World vultures.

== Taxonomy ==
The great black hawk was formally described in 1788 by the German naturalist Johann Friedrich Gmelin in his revised and expanded edition of Carl Linnaeus's Systema Naturae. He placed it with the eagles, hawks and relatives in the genus Falco and coined the binomial name Falco urubitinga. Gmelin's description was ultimately based on the "urubitinga" that had been described in 1648 by the German naturalist Georg Marcgrave in his Historia Naturalis Brasiliae. The great black hawk is now one of nine species placed in the genus Buteogallus was introduced in 1830 by the French naturalist René Lesson. The name genus is a portmanteau of Buteo, a genus introduced in 1779 by Bernard Germain de Lacépède for the buzzards and the genus Gallus introduced in 1760 by Mathurin Jacques Brisson for the junglefowl. The specific epithet urubitinga is from Tupi Urubú tinga meaning "big black bird" for such a raptor.

Two subspecies are recognised:

- B. u. ridgwayi (Gurney, JH Sr, 1884) – Mexico to west Panama
- B. u. urubitinga (Gmelin, JF, 1788) – east Panama to north Argentina

== Description ==
The adult great black hawk is 56 to 64 centimetres (22 to 25 in) long and weighs 1.1 kilograms (2 lb 7 oz). It resembles the common black hawk, but is larger with a different call and tail pattern. It has very broad wings, and is mainly black. The short tail is white with a broad black tip. The bill is black and the legs and cere are yellow.

The sexes are similar, but immature birds are dark brown above with spotting and streaks. Their underparts are buff with dark spots, and the tail has a number of black and dusky bars. The call of the great black hawk is a distinctive piping ooo-wheeeeee.

== Distribution and habitat ==
The great black hawk is a resident breeding bird in the tropical New World, from Mexico through Central America to Peru, Tobago and northern Argentina. It is a mainly coastal bird, but also lives in forests and open woodland near water.

=== Vagrancy ===
A great black hawk was first recorded in the ABA area on South Padre Island, Texas in April 2018. In August of that year the same individual, based on similarities in what is highly variable immature plumage, resurfaced in Biddeford, Maine. This individual was ranked as the #1 "Craziest Vagrant of 2018" by the ABA.

After disappearing for several months it reappeared in Deering Oaks park in Portland, Maine, where it remained a resident until being rescued during a snow storm on January 20, and transported to the bird rehab facility Avian Haven. The bird was euthanized on January 31 at Avian Haven due to extensive frostbite which prevented blood from reaching either leg or foot. In January 2020 it was mounted and is set to be displayed at the Maine State Museum.

== Breeding ==
It builds a large stick nest in a tree, and usually lays one dark-blotched whitish egg.

== Diet ==
The great black hawk feeds mainly on reptiles, other small vertebrates (such as amphibians, fish, birds, and small mammals [including bats]), crabs, large insects, carrion, eggs, and fruits, often hunted on foot. This species is often seen soaring above woodlands. Along Amazon rivers it has been observed raiding hoatzin nesting colonies looking for eggs and chicks.

immature, Pantanal, Brazil

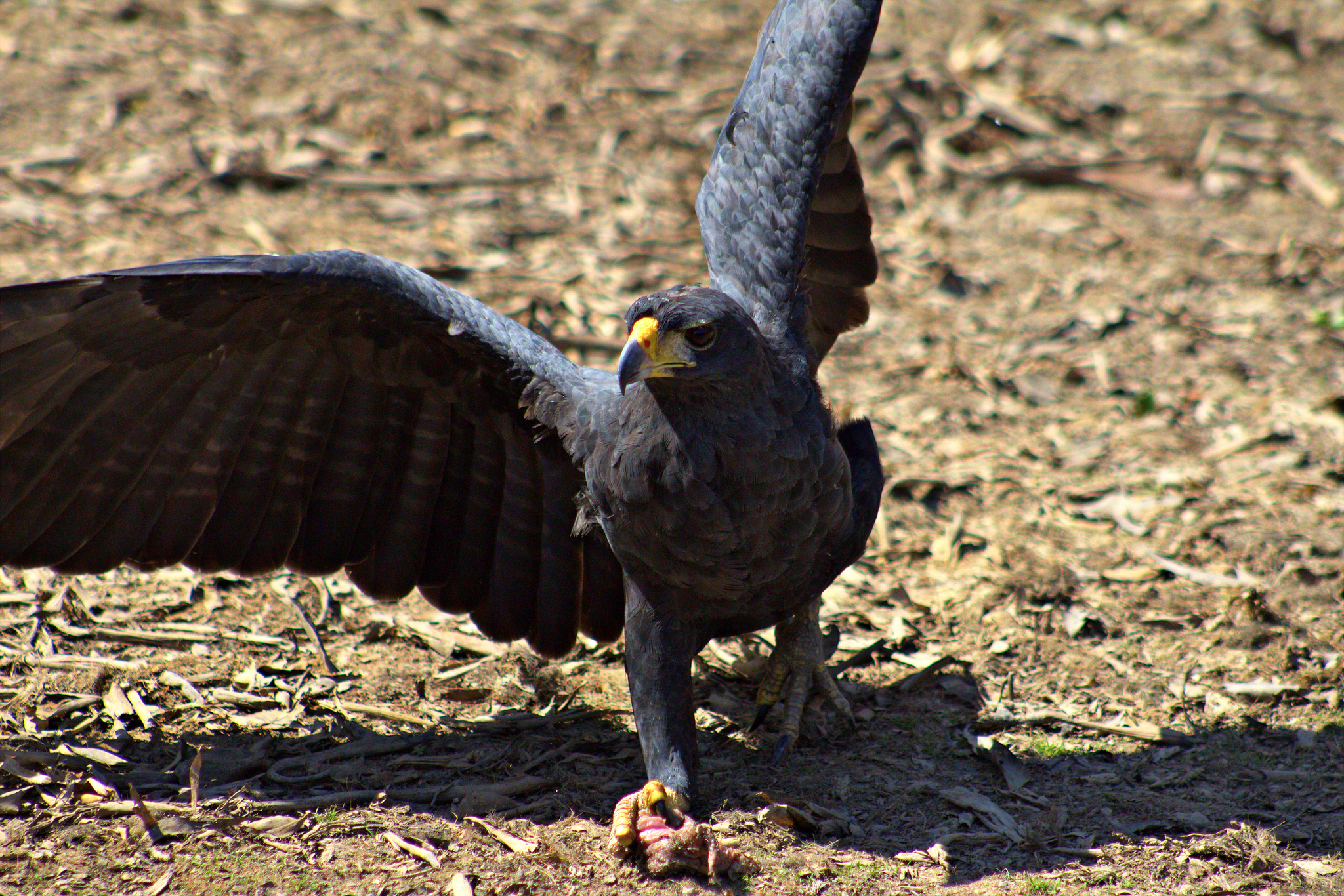
In Apure State, Venezuela

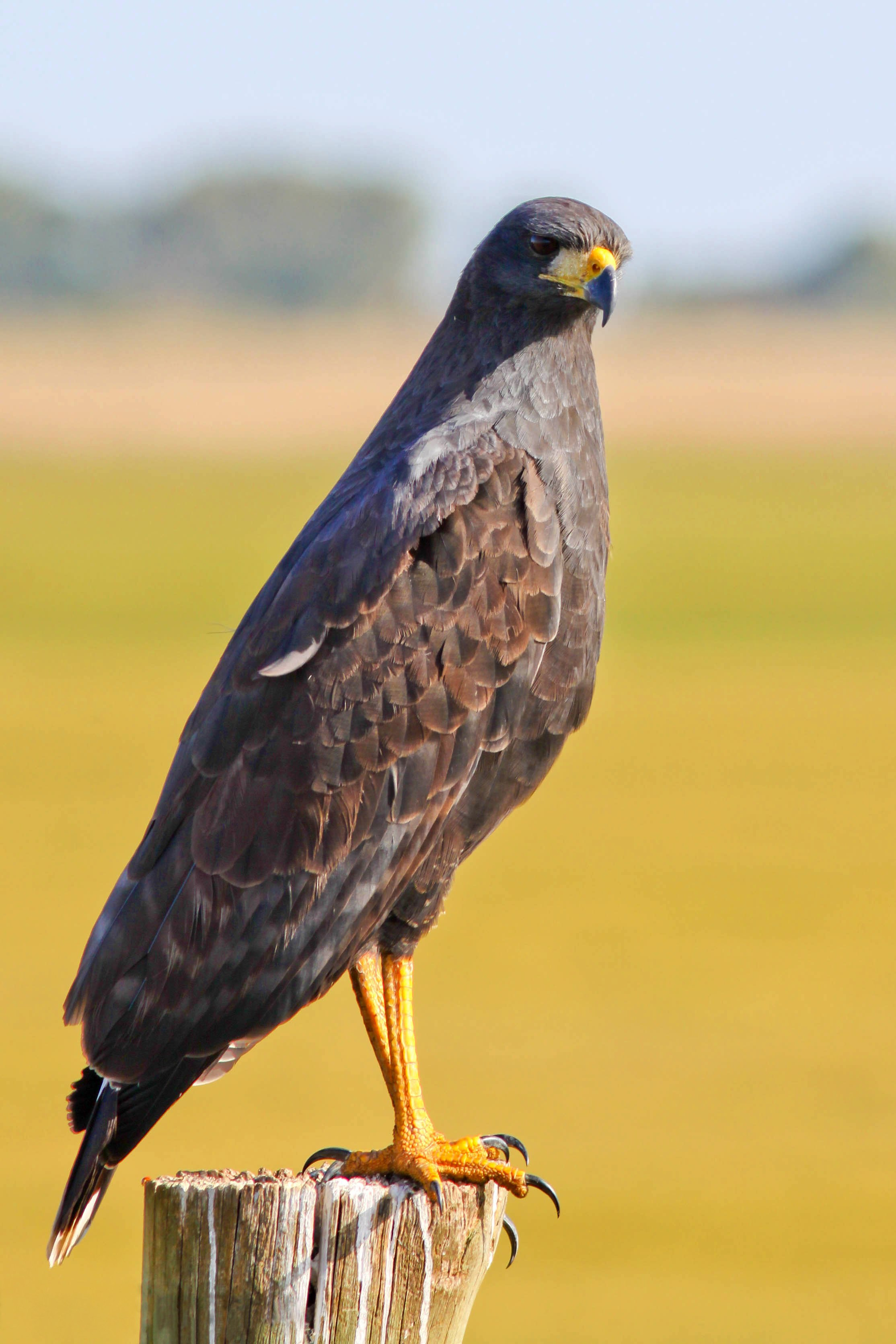
South Brazil
