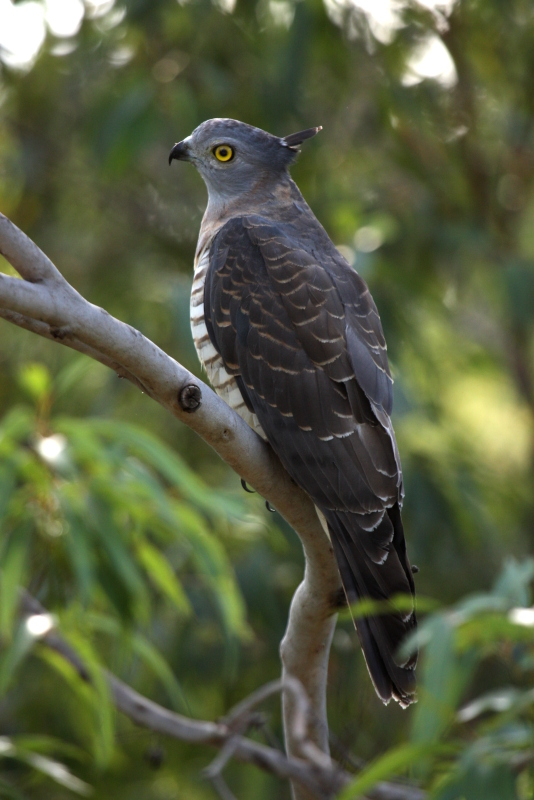
- Pacific baza (Aviceda subcristata)

Scientific classification
- Kingdom: Animalia
- Phylum: Chordata
- Class: Aves
- Order: Accipitriformes
- Family: Accipitridae
- Subfamily: Perninae; Blyth, 1851

= Perninae =

Subfamily of birds

The raptor subfamily Perninae includes a number of medium-sized broad-winged bird of prey species known as perns. These are birds of warmer climates, although the Pernis species (European honey buzzard and crested honey buzzard) have a more extensive range.

Several of the species in this group eat mainly insects, and the honey-buzzards are specialist feeders on wasp larvae. Reptiles are also taken by several birds in this group.

Several authorities consider the vultures of Gypaetinae to be within or even synonymous with Perninae.

== Taxonomy ==
The cladogram of the Perninae shown below is based on a molecular phylogenetic study of the Accipitridae by Therese Catanach and collaborators that was published in 2024.

- Perninae
  - Eutriorchis – Madagascar serpent eagle (placement uncertain)
  - - - Chondrohierax – kites (2 species)
      - Leptodon – kites (2 species)
    - - Aviceda – bazas and cuckoo-hawks (5 species)
      - - Pernis – honey buzzards (4 species)
        - - Elanoides – swallow-tailed kite
          - - Hamirostra – black-breasted buzzard
            - - Lophoictinia – square-tailed kite
              - Henicopernis – honey buzzards (2 species)

=== Genera ===
Image	Genus	Living species
	Eutriorchis Sharpe, 1875	Madagascar serpent eagle Eutriorchis astur
	Chondrohierax Lesson, 1843	Hook-billed kite, Chondrohierax uncinatus; Cuban kite, Chondrohierax wilsonii
	Leptodon Sundevall, 1836	Grey-headed kite, Leptodon cayanensis; White-collared kite, Leptodon forbesi
	Aviceda Swainson, 1836	African cuckoo-hawk, Aviceda cuculoides; Madagascar cuckoo-hawk, Aviceda madagascariensis; Jerdon's baza, Aviceda jerdoni; Pacific baza, Aviceda subcristata; Black baza, Aviceda leuphotes
	Pernis Cuvier, 1816	European honey buzzard, Pernis apivorus; Crested honey buzzard, Pernis ptilorhynchus; Barred honey buzzard, Pernis celebensis; Philippine honey buzzard,Pernis steerei
	Elanoides Vieillot, 1818	Swallow-tailed kite Elanoides forficatus; E. f. forficatus (Linn. 1758); E. f. yetapa(Vieillot, 1818)
	Hamirostra Brown, 1846	Black-breasted buzzard Hamirostra melanosternon
	Lophoictinia Kaup, 1847	Square-tailed kite Lophoictinia isura
	Henicopernis (Lesson & Garnot, 1828)	Long-tailed honey buzzard, Henicopernis longicauda; Black honey buzzard, Henicopernis infuscatus
