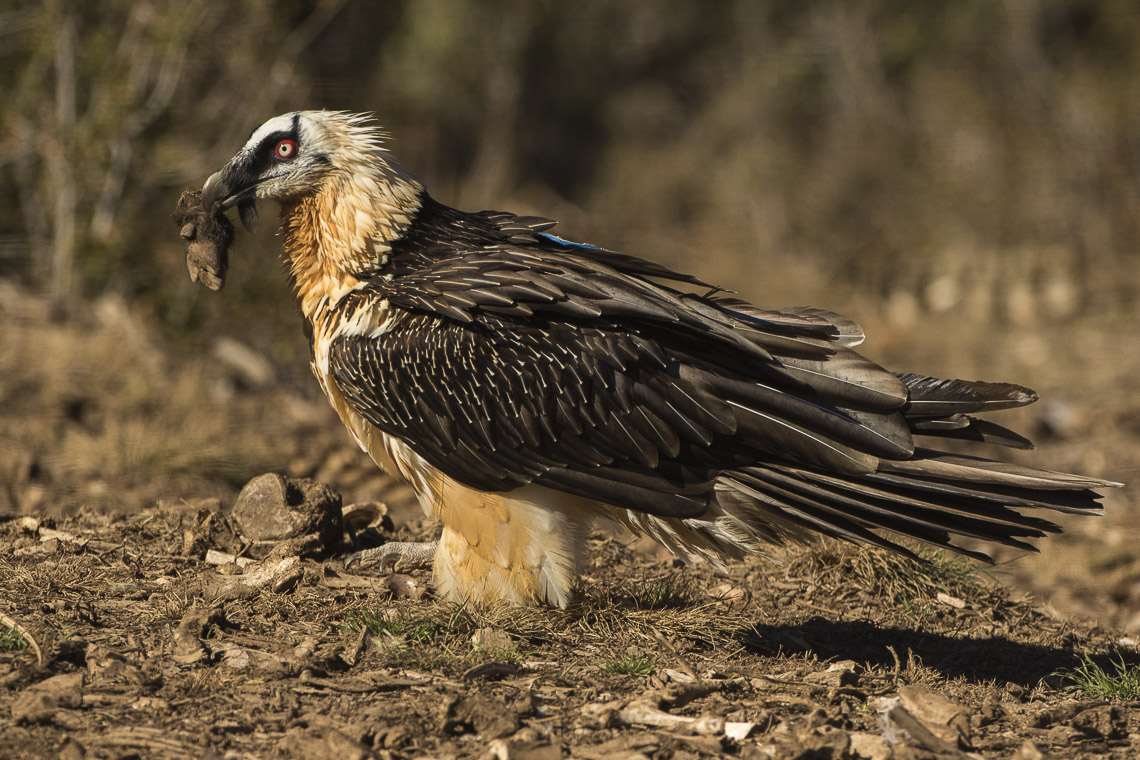
- Bearded vulture (Gypaetus barbatus)

Scientific classification
- Kingdom: Animalia
- Phylum: Chordata
- Class: Aves
- Order: Accipitriformes
- Family: Accipitridae
- Subfamily: Gypaetinae

Genera
- See text.

= Gypaetinae =

Subfamily of birds

The Gypaetinae is one of two subfamilies of Old World vultures the other being the Aegypiinae. This subfamily is considered a sister group to Perninae. They are presently found throughout much of Africa, Asia, and southern Europe, hence being considered "Old World" vultures, but as recently as the Late Pleistocene, they were also present in North America.

== Species ==
=== Extant genera ===
Subfamily	Genus	Common and binomial names	Image	Range
Gypaetinae	Gypaetus Storr, 1784	Bearded vulture Gypaetus barbatus		High mountains in southern Europe, the Caucasus, Africa, the Indian subcontinent, and Tibet
Gypaetinae	Gypaetus Storr, 1784	†Gypaetus georgii		Fossil record from the late Miocene, Spain
Gypaetinae	Gypohierax Rüppell, 1836	Palm-nut vulture Gypohierax angolensis		Forest and savannah across sub-Saharan Africa
Gypaetinae	Neophron Savigny, 1809	Egyptian vulture Neophron percnopterus		Southwestern Europe and northern Africa to India
Gypaetinae	Neophron Savigny, 1809	†Neophron lolis		Fossil record from the late Miocene, Spain

=== Fossil genera ===
Genera known only from fossils include:

Subfamily	Genus	Common and binomial names	Image	Range
Gypaetinae	†Anchigyps	†Anchigyps voorhiesi		Late Miocene to early Pliocene of North America
Gypaetinae	†Arikarornis	†Arikarornis macdonaldi		Early Miocene of North America
Gypaetinae	†Mioneophron	†Mioneophron longirostris		Late Miocene of China
Gypaetinae	†Neophrontops	†Neophrontops americanus		Miocene to Late Pleistocene of North America
Gypaetinae	†Neophrontops	†Neophrontops dakotensis		Miocene to Late Pleistocene of North America
Gypaetinae	†Neophrontops	†Neophrontops slaughteri		Miocene to Late Pleistocene of North America
Gypaetinae	†Neophrontops	†Neophrontops vallecitoensis		Miocene to Late Pleistocene of North America
Gypaetinae	†Neophrontops	†Neophrontops vetustus		Miocene to Late Pleistocene of North America
Gypaetinae	†Neogyps (sometimes placed in the Aegypiinae)	†Neogyps errans		Late Pleistocene of North America
Gypaetinae	†Palaeoborus (sometimes placed in the Aegypiinae)	†Palaeoborus howardae		Miocene of North America
Gypaetinae	†Palaeoborus (sometimes placed in the Aegypiinae)	†Palaeoborus rosatus		Miocene of North America
Gypaetinae	†Palaeoborus (sometimes placed in the Aegypiinae)	†Palaeoborus umbrosus		Miocene of North America

== Taxonomy and systematics ==
The three members of Gypaetinae, together with four other genera, are collectively basal to the Perninae sensu stricto (Aviceda clade plus Pernis clade). Those four are: Polyboroides typus (African harrier hawk), Eutriorchis astur (Madagascar serpent eagle), Chondrohierax and Leptodon .

The new-world genera Chondrohierax (hook-billed kite and Cuban kite) and Leptodon (gray-headed kite and white-collared kite) likely form a clade within the larger group. The placement of Polyboroides and Eutriorchis has been problematic.

Within the Accipitridae, the Elaninae diverged earliest, then this clade – consisting of Polyboroides, Gypaetinae, Eutriorchis, Chondrohierax, Leptodon, and Perninae – is sister to the remaining accipitrids.

== Other sources ==
- Ferguson-Lees, James; Christie, David A. (2001). Raptors of the World. Illustrated by Kim Franklin, David Mead, and Philip Burton. Houghton Mifflin. ISBN 978-0-618-12762-7.
- Grimmett, Richard; Inskipp, Carol; Inskipp, Tim (1999). Birds of India, Pakistan, Nepal, Bangladesh, Bhutan, Sri Lanka, and the Maldives. Illustrated by Clive Byers et al. Princeton University Press. ISBN 978-0-691-04910-6. OCLC 43578307.
- Lerner, Heather R. L.; Mindell, David P. (November 2005). "Phylogeny of eagles, Old World vultures, and other Accipitridae based on nuclear and mitochondrial DNA" (PDF). Molecular Phylogenetics and Evolution. 37 (2): 327–346. Bibcode:2005MolPE..37..327L. doi:10.1016/j.ympev.2005.04.010. ISSN 1055-7903. PMID 15925523. Archived from the original (PDF) on 6 June 2011.
