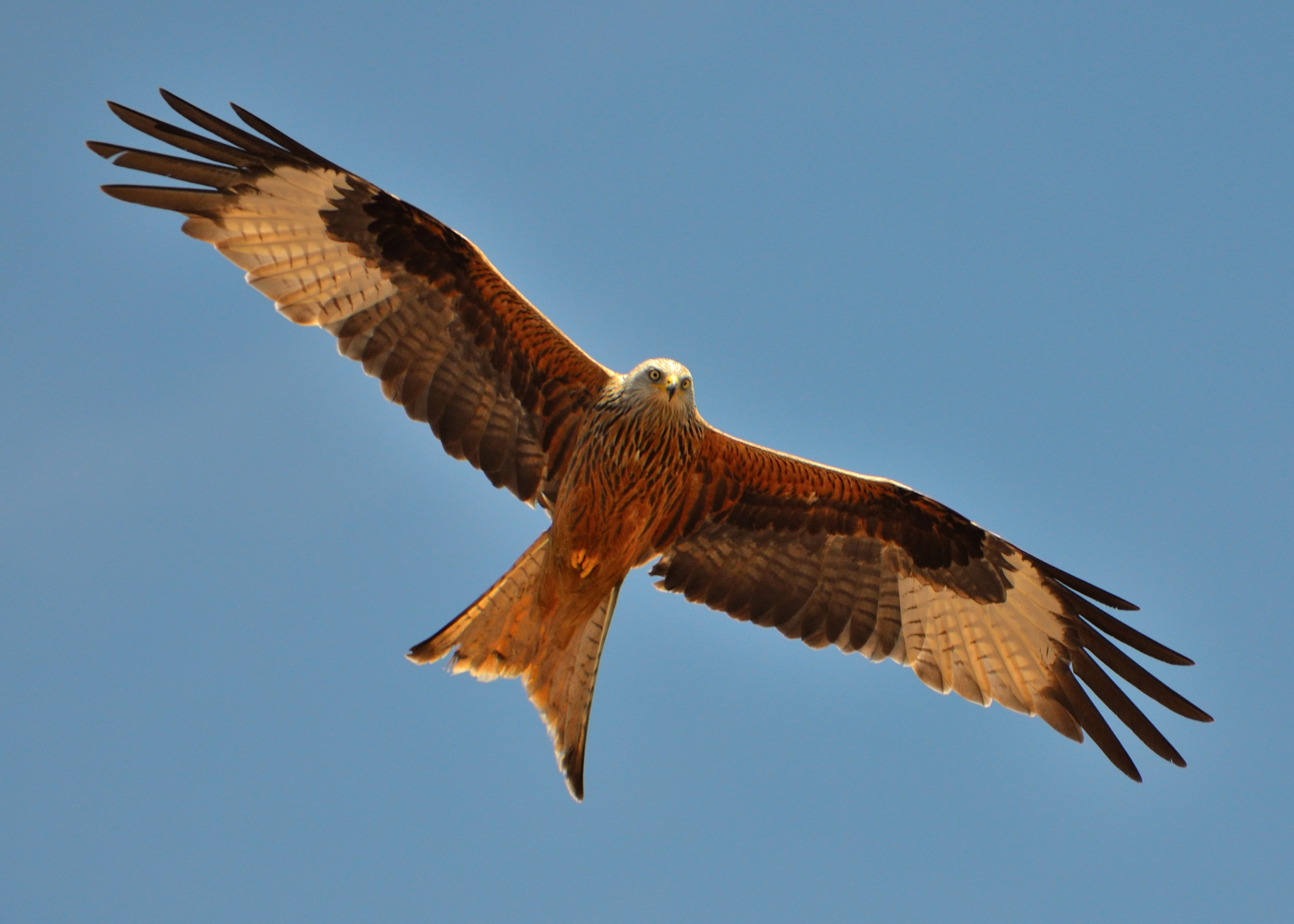
- Red kite (Milvus milvus)

Scientific classification
- Kingdom: Animalia
- Phylum: Chordata
- Class: Aves
- Order: Accipitriformes
- Family: Accipitridae

Groups included
- Elaninae; Haliastur; Milvus; Ictinia; Rostrhamus; Helicolestes; Harpagus; Leptodon; Chondrohierax; Lophoictinia

= Kite (bird) =

Bird of prey

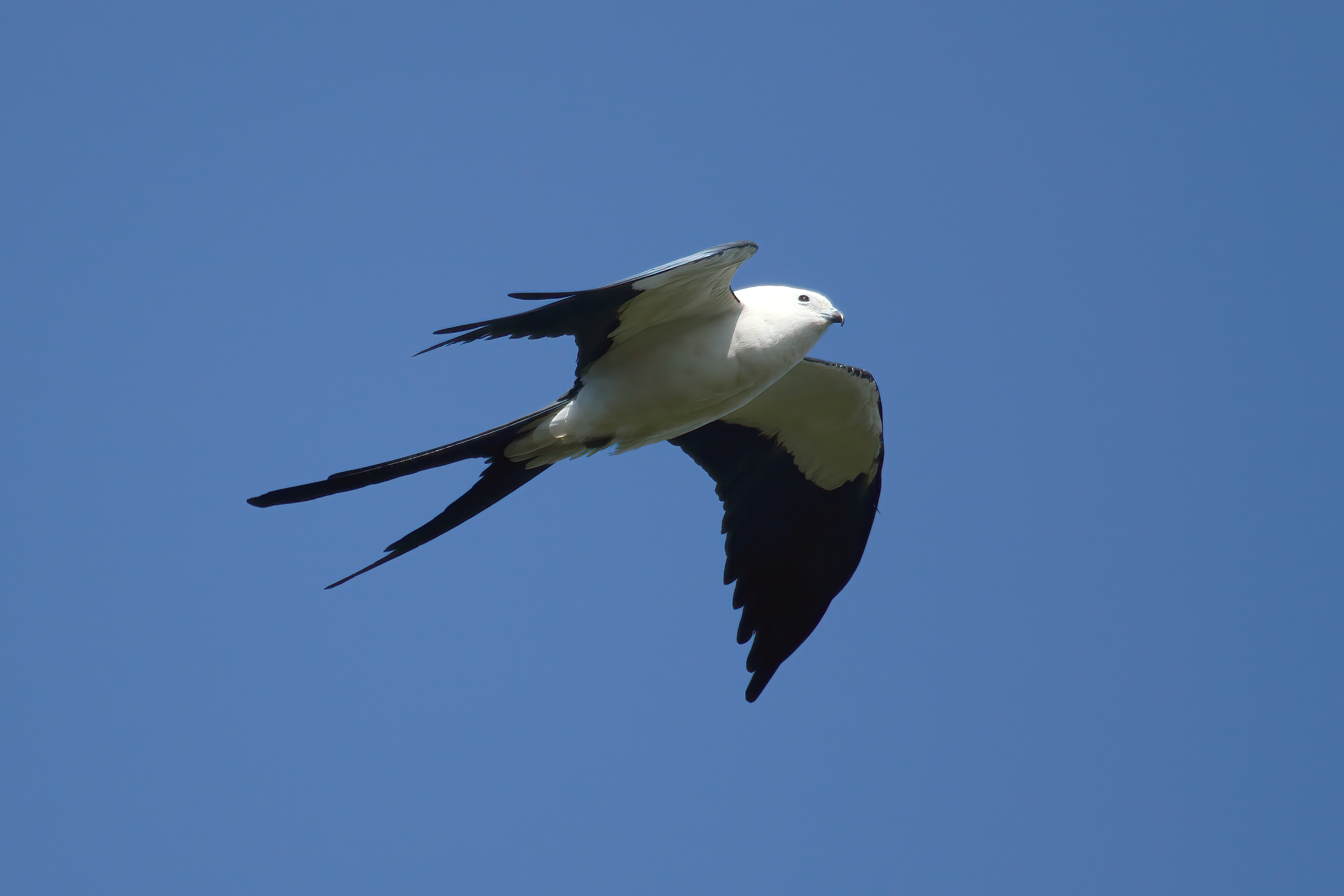
Swallow-tailed kite gliding

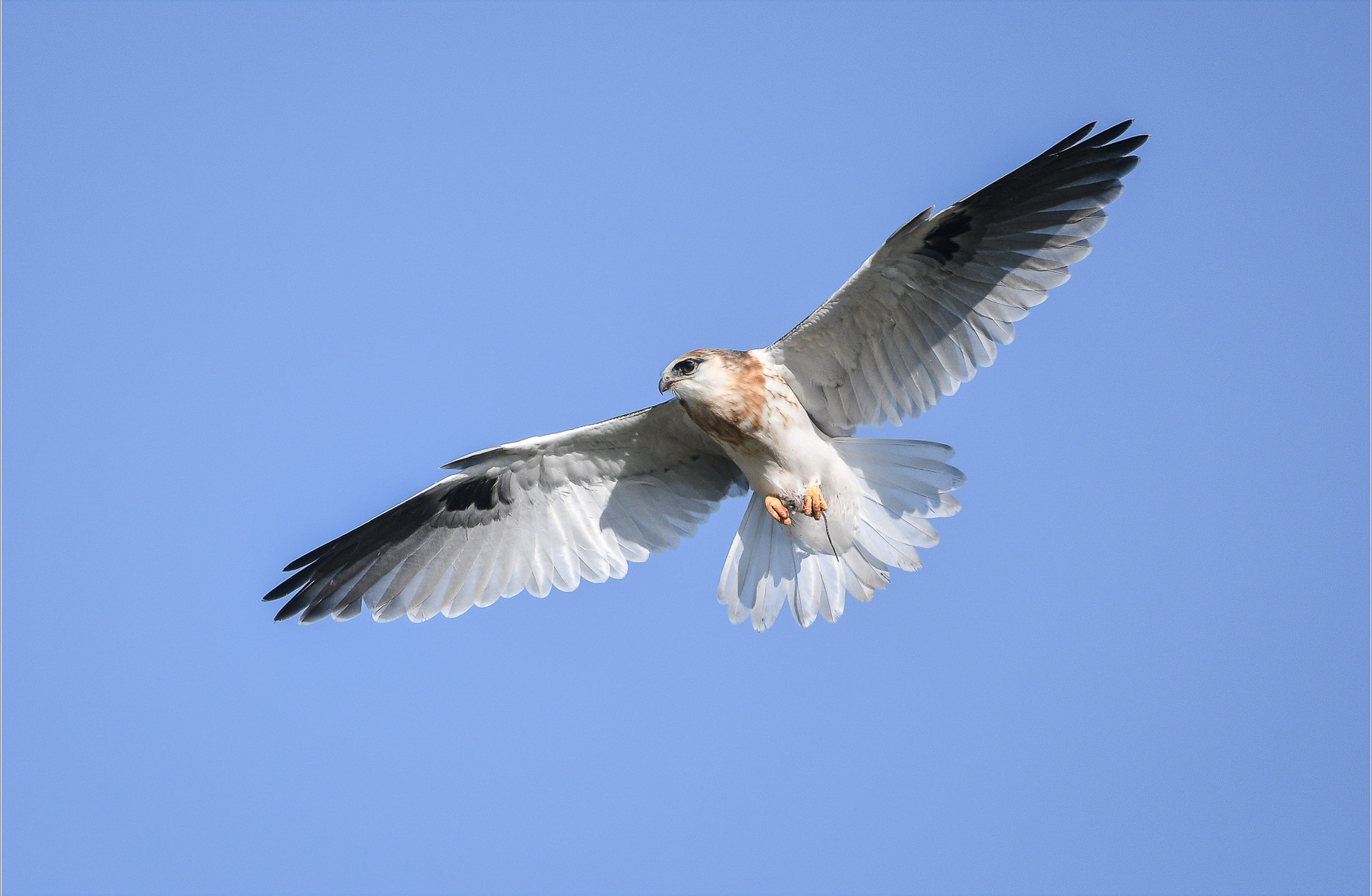
Black-shouldered kite in flight

Kite is the common name for certain birds of prey in the family Accipitridae, particularly in the subfamilies Elaninae and Perninae and certain genera within Buteoninae and Harpaginae. The term is derived from Old English cȳta, onomatopoeic from the call notes of the buzzard (Buteo buteo) and red kite (Milvus milvus). The name, having no cognate names in other European languages, is thought to have arisen in England; it apparently originally denoted the buzzard, as the red kite was then known by the widespread Germanic name 'glede' or 'glead', and was only later transferred to the red kite as "fork-tailed kite" by Christopher Merret in his 1667 Pinax Rerum Naturalium Britannicarum. By the time of Thomas Pennant's 1768 British Zoology, the name had become fixed on the red kite, other birds named 'kite' around the world being named from their then-perceived relationship to it.

Some authors use the terms "hovering kite" and "soaring kite" to distinguish between Elanus and Milvus kites, respectively. The group may also be differentiated by size, referring to Milvus kites and their relatives as "large kites", and elanine kites as "small kites".

== Species ==
The following species, from multiple subdivisions of the family Accipitridae, have 'kite' in their English names:

- Subfamily Elaninae
  - Genus Elanus
    - Black-winged kite Elanus caeruleus
    - Black-shouldered kite Elanus axillaris
    - White-tailed kite Elanus leucurus
    - Letter-winged kite Elanus scriptus
  - Genus Chelictinia
    - Scissor-tailed kite Chelictinia riocourii
  - Genus Gampsonyx
    - Pearl kite Gampsonyx swainsonii
- Subfamily Buteoninae
  - Genus Haliastur
    - Whistling kite Haliastur sphenurus
    - Brahminy kite Haliastur indus
  - Genus Milvus
    - Red kite Milvus milvus
      - Cape Verde kite Milvus milvus fasciicauda – extinct (2000)
    - Black kite Milvus migrans
      - Black-eared kite Milvus migrans lineatus
    - Yellow-billed kite Milvus aegyptius
  - Genus Ictinia
    - Mississippi kite Ictinia mississippiensis
    - Plumbeous kite Ictinia plumbea
  - Genus Rostrhamus
    - Snail kite Rostrhamus sociabilis
  - Genus Helicolestes
    - Slender-billed kite Helicolestes hamatus – formerly in Rostrhamus
- Subfamily Harpaginae
  - Genus Harpagus
    - Double-toothed kite Harpagus bidentatus
    - Rufous-thighed kite Harpagus diodon
- Subfamily Perninae
  - Genus Elanoides
    - Swallow-tailed kite Elanoides forficatus
  - Genus Leptodon
    - Grey-headed kite Leptodon cayanensis
    - White-collared kite Leptodon forbesi
  - Genus Chondrohierax
    - Hook-billed kite Chondrohierax uncinatus
    - Cuban kite Chondrohierax wilsonii
  - Genus Lophoictinia
    - Square-tailed kite Lophoictinia isura

== Taxonomy and systematics ==
=== 19th century ===
In 1824, Vigors proposed five divisions or stirpes of the family Falconidae: Aquilina (eagles), Accipitrina (hawks), Falconina (falcons), Buteonina (buzzards) and Milvina (kites, containing two genera Elanus and Milvus). He distinguished the kites as having weaker bill and feebler talons than the buzzards, tail more or less forked, and wings longer than the tail.

In Elanus, he grouped the black-winged kite (now several Elanus spp.), scissor-tailed kite (now Chelictinia), and swallow-tailed kite (now Elanoides). These species all have pointed wings with the second primary the longest. The pattern of scales on the legs (acrotarsi) is reticulated, and the toes are separated. But Vigors noted that only the black-winged kite had rounded undersides on the nails of its talons, a trait found in the osprey but not in any other raptors, and thus suggested a separation of Elanus into two sections. A year later, he established a separate genus Nauclerus for the scissor- and swallow-tailed kites.

Milvus contained the familiar red and black kites. The fourth primary feather is the longest, leg scales are scutellated, and the exterior toe is united to the middle toe by a membrane.

Vigors placed Ictinia, "the Milan Cresserelle of M. Vieillot" and "the Mississippi Kite of Mr. Wilson", into Buteonina. Though noting that "the wings are of considerable length, extending far beyond the tail, a character which has induced M. Vieillot and others to place this bird near the Kites", he wrote that the strong affinity in characteristics and manners warranted it to be placed closer to the falcons.

=== 20th century ===
Swann's 1922 synopsis grouped all the kites together with the "cuckoo-falcons" and honey buzzards into a large Milvinæ subfamily. His order was: Elanoides, Chelictinia, Milvus, Lophoictinia, Rostrhamus, Helicolestes, Chondrohierax, Odontriorchis, Gypoictinia (=Hamirostra), Elanus, Gampsonyx, Ictinia, Harpagus, Baza, Aviceda, Henicopernis, Machærhamphus, Pernis.

In contrast, Peters grouped the large kites into subfamily Milvinae and most small kites into Elaninae, with a few small kites joining the honey-buzzards and bazas in Perninae. His arrangement of kite genera was as follows:

- Elaninae: Elanus, Chelictinia, Machaerhamphus.
- Perninae: Elanoïdes, (Aviceda, Henicopernis, Pernis, Odontotriorchis), Chondrohierax.
- Milvinae: Harpagus, Ictinia, Rostrhamus, Helicolestes, Milvus, Lophoictinia, Hamirostra, Haliastur.
- Polyhieracinae: Gampsonyx

The pearl kite Gampsonyx had variously been placed with the accipiters, forest-falcons, or elanine kites. It was not until the 1960s that a similar moult schedule established its affinity to Elanus.

=== 21st century ===
By 2015, genetic research showed that many of the kite genera are related to honey-buzzards. Several of the large kites are related more closely to the Buteo hawks (buzzards) than to other kites and sea-eagles.

Boyd places the "true" milvine kites (Milvus and Haliastur) with the sea-eagles in tribe Milvini within Buteoninae. This results in the following arrangement (genera in parentheses are not generally called kites):

- Elaninae: Gampsonyx, Chelictinia, Elanus.
- Perninae: Chondrohierax, Leptodon, Elanoides, (Pernis), Hamirostra, Lophoictinia, (Henicopernis).
- Buteoninae
  - Harpagini: Harpagus.
  - Milvini: Haliastur, Milvus, (Haliaeetus, Icthyophaga).
  - Buteonini: many genera, including the kites Ictinia, Rostrhamus, and Helicolestes.
    Ictinia is near-basal, after the Old-World genus Butastur. Rostrhamus and Helicolestes form a clade with the black-collared hawk (Busarellus) and the crane hawk (Geranospiza).

As early as 1882, Anton Reichenow had also placed Section Milvinæ alongside Section Buteoninæ in Subfamily Buteoninæ.

== In mythology ==
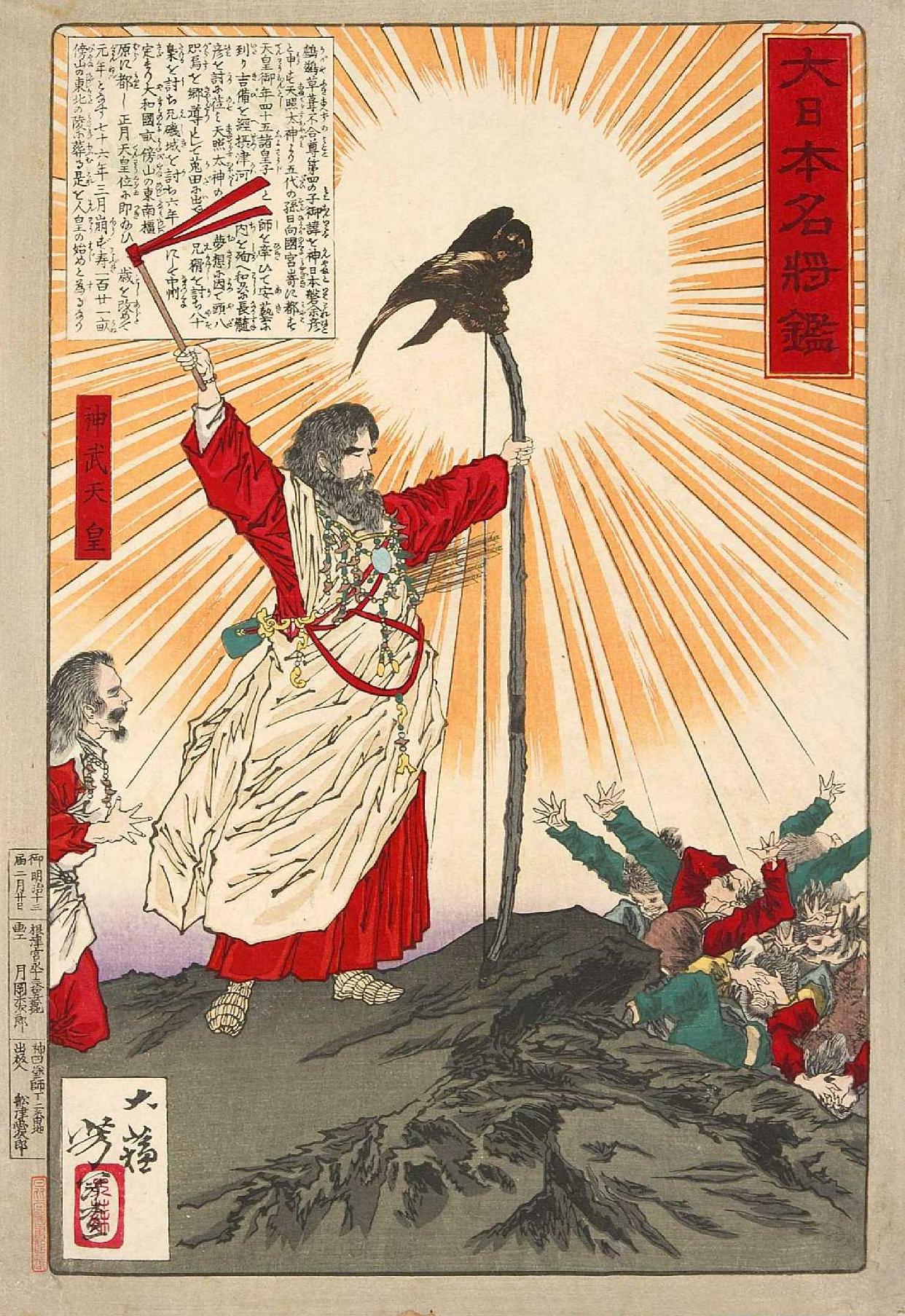
Woodblock print of the legend of the golden kite, 1880

Isis is said in ancient Egyptian mythology to have taken the form of a kite in various situations in order to resurrect the dead.

It also figures in several fables by Aesop which underline its character as a predator: The Sick Kite, The Kite and the Doves and a variant of The Crow and the Snake.

In Japanese mythology, Emperor Jimmu, the legendary first emperor of Japan, defeated the rival chief Nagasunehiko with the aid of a kite. The bird perched upon his bow and emitted rays of light that dazzled his enemies.

In pre-colonial Philippine mythology, the Tagalog creation myth begins with a kite, the sea, and the sky. The kite causes the sea and sky to go to war, and after the war, land is formed, allowing the kite to finally land and build a nest.

In Bushongo mythology, Chedi Bumba (third son of the god M'Bombo: the original creator of everything) in his quest to improve upon his father's design; was only able to create the Kite.
