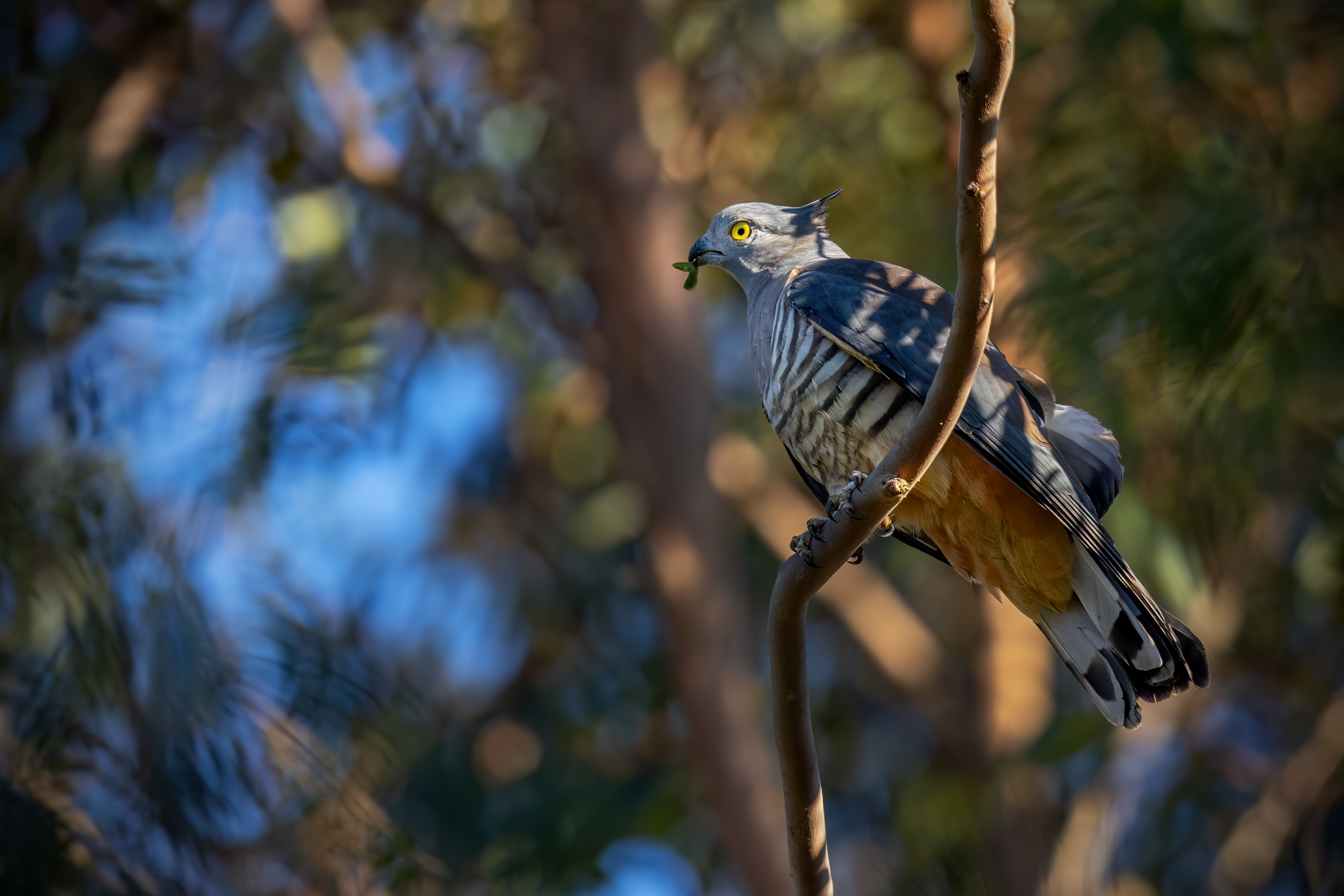

Conservation status
- Least Concern (IUCN 3.1)

Scientific classification
- Kingdom: Animalia
- Phylum: Chordata
- Class: Aves
- Order: Accipitriformes
- Family: Accipitridae
- Genus: Aviceda
- Species: A. subcristata

Binomial name
- Aviceda subcristata (Gould, 1838)
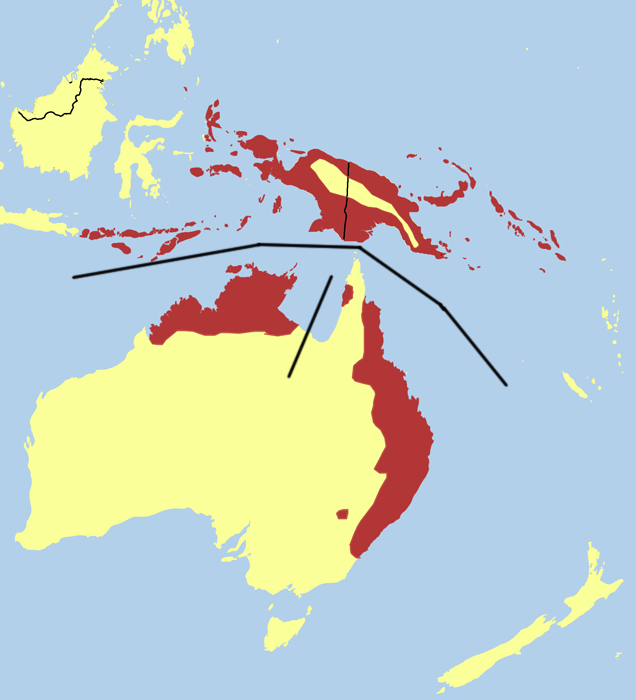
- Distribution of the Pacific baza. Thick lines demarcate some subspecies, but note that there are actually 13 in total.

= Pacific baza =

Species of bird

The Pacific baza (Aviceda subcristata), also known as the crested hawk, crested baza, and Pacific cuckoo-falcon, is a slender, medium-sized species of hawk in the family Accipitridae. It is mostly grey, brown, and white coloured and grows to a length of 35–46 centimetres (14–18 in). It is an omnivore and usually does not migrate. The breeding season for the species lasts from September to at least February, during which time specimens commonly fly and vocalise for display. It lives in Australia, Indonesia, Papua New Guinea, Solomon Islands, and East Timor, in forests, savannas, and freshwater bodies. The International Union for Conservation of Nature lists it as a least concern species.

== Taxonomy ==
John Gould first presented this new species as Lepidogenys subcristatus to a Zoological Society of London meeting in December 1837, placing it into a genus (Lophotes Gray 1831, but with this new name as it was already in use for a genus of fish) that was at the time considered separate from Aviceda. The name would be formally published in April of the next year, in part 3 of Gould's A synopsis of the birds of Australia, and the adjacent islands, which reproduced the paper read the previous year. Frédéric de Lafresnaye would later—in 1846—combine the Asian Lepidogenys and African Aviceda into a single genus. However, the species was also known for some time as Baza subcristata before it was demonstrated that Aviceda held nomenclatural priority over Swainson's Baza. Johann Jakob Kaup had in the meantime placed the species in Pernis, a placement not followed by any other authors.

This bird, the African cuckoo-hawk (Aviceda cuculoides), Madagascar cuckoo-hawk (A. madagascariensis), and Jerdon's baza (A. jerdoni), were previously thought to form a species complex.

This hawk has 13 known subspecies:

- Aviceda subcristata bismarckii (Sharpe, 1888)
- A. s. coultasi (Mayr, 1945)
- A. s. gurneyi (E. P. Ramsay, 1882)
- A. s. megala (Stresemann, 1913)
- A. s. obscura (Junge, 1956)
- A. s. pallida (Stresemann, 1913)
- A. s. reinwardtii (Schlegel & S. Müller, 1841)
- A. s. rufa (Schlegel, 1866)
- A. s. stenozona (G. R. Gray, 1858)
- A. s. stresemani (Siebers, 1930)
- A. s. subcristata (Gould, 1838)
- A. s. timorlaoensis (A. B. Meyer, 1893)
- A. s. waigeuensis (Mayr, 1940)

A. s. proxima and robusta have been proposed as subspecies that live in various parts of the Solomon Islands, but these are considered to be the same subspecies as gurneyi.

The genus name, Aviceda, means "bird-killer", combining the Latin words avis, which translates to "bird", and caedere, which translates to "to kill". The specific name, subcristata, combines the Latin words for "somewhat" and "crested", referring to the small crest on the back of its neck. This bird was historically most commonly known as the crested hawk, but Pacific baza is now the most frequently-used common name. It is often referred to as "cuckoo-hawk" in Africa and "lizard-hawk" in India.

== Description ==
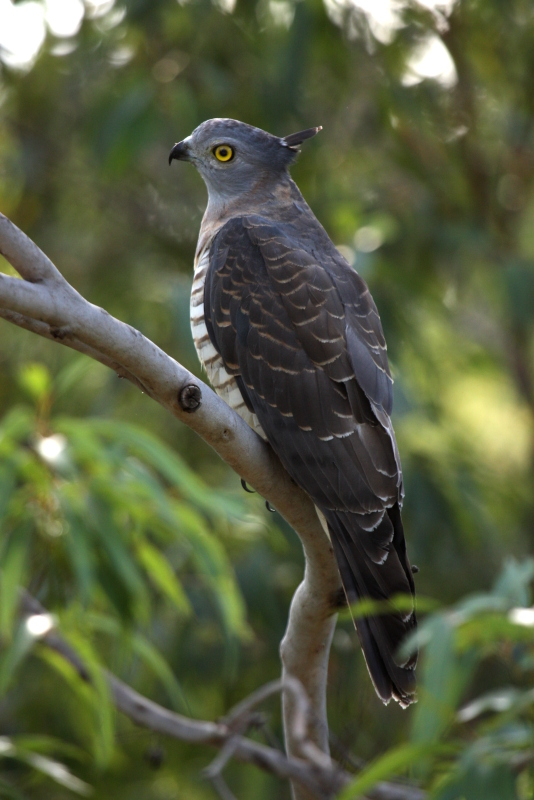
Immature, Kobble Ck, SE Queensland, Australia

The Pacific baza is a slender, medium-sized bird, with a slim head and neck. Its appearance is similar to that of other species in its genus. It grows to a total length of 35–46 centimetres (14–18 in), with a wingspan of 80–105 centimetres (31–41 in) and a tail length of 19–23 centimetres (7.5–9.1 in). It weighs 260–450 grams (9.2–15.9 oz), with females being slightly heavier than males. Specimens are typically smaller in the extreme western and eastern parts of its range.

The species have a white underside, which is barred with black. Its upperside is grey, with brown scapulas. It has a grey head, which is small proportionally and partially domed, and yellow eyes, which are round and located far into the side of its head. Its thighs are reddish-brown coloured and its feet are grey. It has bands on its fingers, which are visible when flying in circles. It is the only New Guinean raptor that is crested, having a small, spiky crest on its nape. Its wings are broad, rounded, and paddle-shaped with distinct bands; they are very large in comparison to its body. They are narrowest where they meet its body, broadening to their ends. The edges of the wings are curved when the bird is in flight. The species has a long tail with a square end, which is tipped with black. It is the same length as the entire rest of its body.

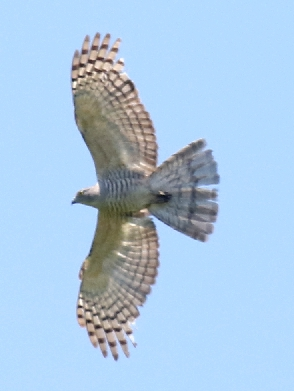
Pacific baza, Newell Beach, Queensland, Australia

Females can be distinguished from males by having a slightly browner upperside and sometimes more barring on their secondary flight feathers. Juveniles can be differentiated from adults by having a much browner upperside. They also have pale eyes, rather than the sharp yellow eyes of adults, a patterned face, smaller barring on their belly, a rust-coloured breast, a white throat, and a cream to blue-grey coloured cere. The Pacific baza can be distinguished from the long-tailed honey buzzard (Henicopernis longicauda), which is similar in appearance to this species, by having less-rounded wings and a breast that is barred rather than streaked.

== Behaviour ==
The omnivorous diet of the Pacific baza consists of fruits, insects, tree-frogs, lizards, snakes, and birds. It was previously thought to be solely a carnivore and only eat fruits accidentally, but observations in the 1970s and later have shown that it frequently eats fruit intentionally. In fact, in 1981, several captive specimens of the Pacific baza would not breed without having lettuce as a part of their diet. It hunts in the canopy of forests and dives down into foliage or air to snatch its prey. Although unconfirmed, it has been rumoured to imitate the calls of tree-frogs when hunting, inducing them to return the call. It produces vocalisations of "pee-peow, pee-peow", consisting of a note rising in pitch followed by a "more explosive" descending note. Although populations in certain parts of Australia have been known to migrate partially, it is generally a non-migratory species. It is characterised as "unobtrusive and docile". A social species, multiple specimens often gather together in the non-breeding season.

Kobble Creek, SE Queensland

The breeding season usually starts in September; in Australia it lasts until February but it can be longer in other countries. During this time, it often soars up and down repeatedly for display and vocalises, positioning its wings in a V-shape when descending. It has also been known to perform various types of somersaults, such as lateral rolls. Its nests are flimsy and composed of sticks, built high in the branches of trees. The species typically lays 1–4 eggs. They have an average size of 4.34 centimetres (1.71 in) in length, 3.51 centimetres (1.38 in) in breadth, and 27 cubic centimetres (1.6 in^{3}) in volume, and are white-coloured with occasional spots. Both males and females incubate them, alternating in average intervals of 1.5 hours. A family studied in 2002 and 2003 had a pre-laying stage period of 16 days, incubation period of 29 days, and nesting period of 35 days. The juveniles became independent from their parents at least 22 days after hatching. The species has a generation length of 7.6 years.

== Distribution ==
The Pacific baza ranges across warmer and more humid parts of the Australasian realm, breeding in Australia, Indonesia, Papua New Guinea, and Solomon Islands and South Africa and resident in East Timor. In Australia, it is only found in areas where the coast is no further than 400 kilometres (250 mi) away, primarily in northern and eastern parts of the country. Its total extent of occurrence is estimated to be 11,100,000 square kilometres (1.11×10^{13} m^{2}). Its habitats are subtropical and tropical forests, dry savannas, and bodies of freshwater, including wetlands, streams, and rivers, usually at elevations less than 1,000 metres (3,300 ft) and rarely greater than 1,300 metres (4,300 ft). It is utilised in the pet trade internationally. Because of its large range and stable population, it is listed as a species of least concern on the IUCN Red List as of 2016.
