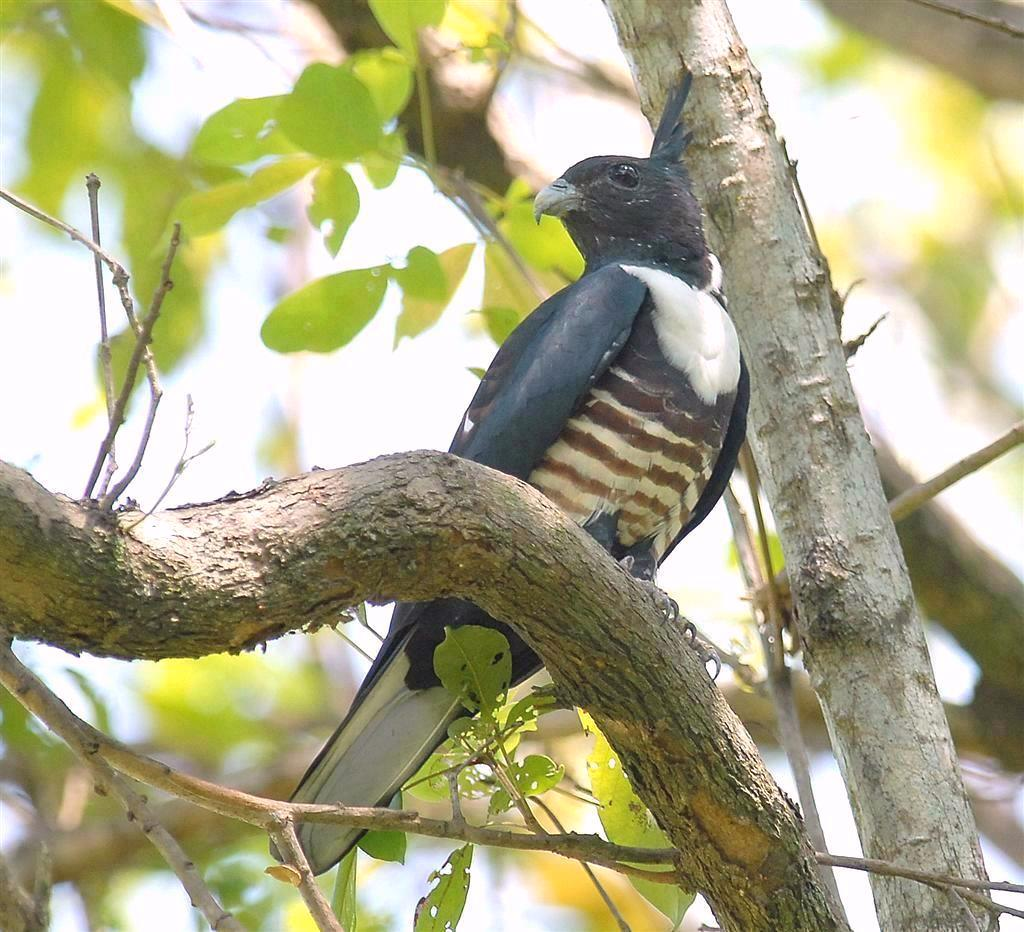
- Black baza (Aviceda leuphotes)

Scientific classification
- Kingdom: Animalia
- Phylum: Chordata
- Class: Aves
- Order: Accipitriformes
- Family: Accipitridae
- Subfamily: Perninae
- Genus: Aviceda; Swainson, 1836

Type species
- Aviceda cuculoides Swainson, 1837

= Aviceda =

Baza

Genus of birds

The bazas, Aviceda, are a genus of bird of prey in the family Accipitridae. The genus has a widespread distribution from Australia to southern Asia and across to Africa. The bazas are sometimes known as cuckoo-hawks. A prominent crest is a feature of the bazas. They have two tooth-like indentations on the edge of the upper bill.

== Etymology ==
Aviceda: Latin: avis 'bird'; -cida 'killer', from caedere 'to kill'.

== Species ==
Genus Aviceda – Swainson, 1836 – five species
Common name	Scientific name and subspecies	Range	Size and ecology	IUCN status and estimated population
African cuckoo-hawk	Aviceda cuculoides Swainson, 1837 Three subspecies: A. c. subsp. cuculoides; A. c. subsp. batesi; A. c. subsp. verreauxii	Sub-Saharan Africa and eastern parts of southern Africa	Size: Habitat: Diet:	LC
Jerdon's baza	Aviceda jerdoni (Blyth, 1842) Six subspecies: A. j. jerdoni (Blyth, 1842); A. j. ceylonensis (Legge, 1876); A. j. borneensis (Sharpe, 1893); A. j. magnirostris (Kaup, 1847); A. j. leucopias (Sharpe, 1888); A. j. celebensis (Schlegel, 1873)	South-east Asia	Size: Habitat: Diet:	LC
Black baza	Aviceda leuphotes (Dumont, 1820) Three subspecies: A. l. syama (Hodgson, 1837); A. l. leuphotes (Dumont, 1820); A. l. andamanica (Abdulali & Grubh, 1970)	Northeast India, the eastern Himalayas, China and Southeast Asia.	Size: Habitat: Diet:	LC
Madagascar cuckoo-hawk	Aviceda madagascariensis (Smith, 1834)	Madagascar.	Size: Habitat: Diet:	LC
Pacific baza	Aviceda subcristata (Gould, 1838) Thirteen subspecies: Aviceda subcristata bismarckii (Sharpe, 1888); A. s. coultasi (Mayr, 1945); A. s. gurneyi (E. P. Ramsay, 1882); A. s. megala (Stresemann, 1913); A. s. obscura (Junge, 1956); A. s. pallida (Stresemann, 1913); A. s. reinwardtii (Schlegel & S. Müller, 1841); A. s. rufa (Schlegel, 1866); A. s. stenozona (G. R. Gray, 1858); A. s. stresemani (Siebers, 1930); A. s. subcristata (Gould, 1838); A. s. timorlaoensis (A. B. Meyer, 1893); A. s. waigeuensis (Mayr, 1940)	Australia, Indonesia, Papua New Guinea, and Solomon Islands and South Africa and East Timor	Size: Habitat: Diet:	LC
