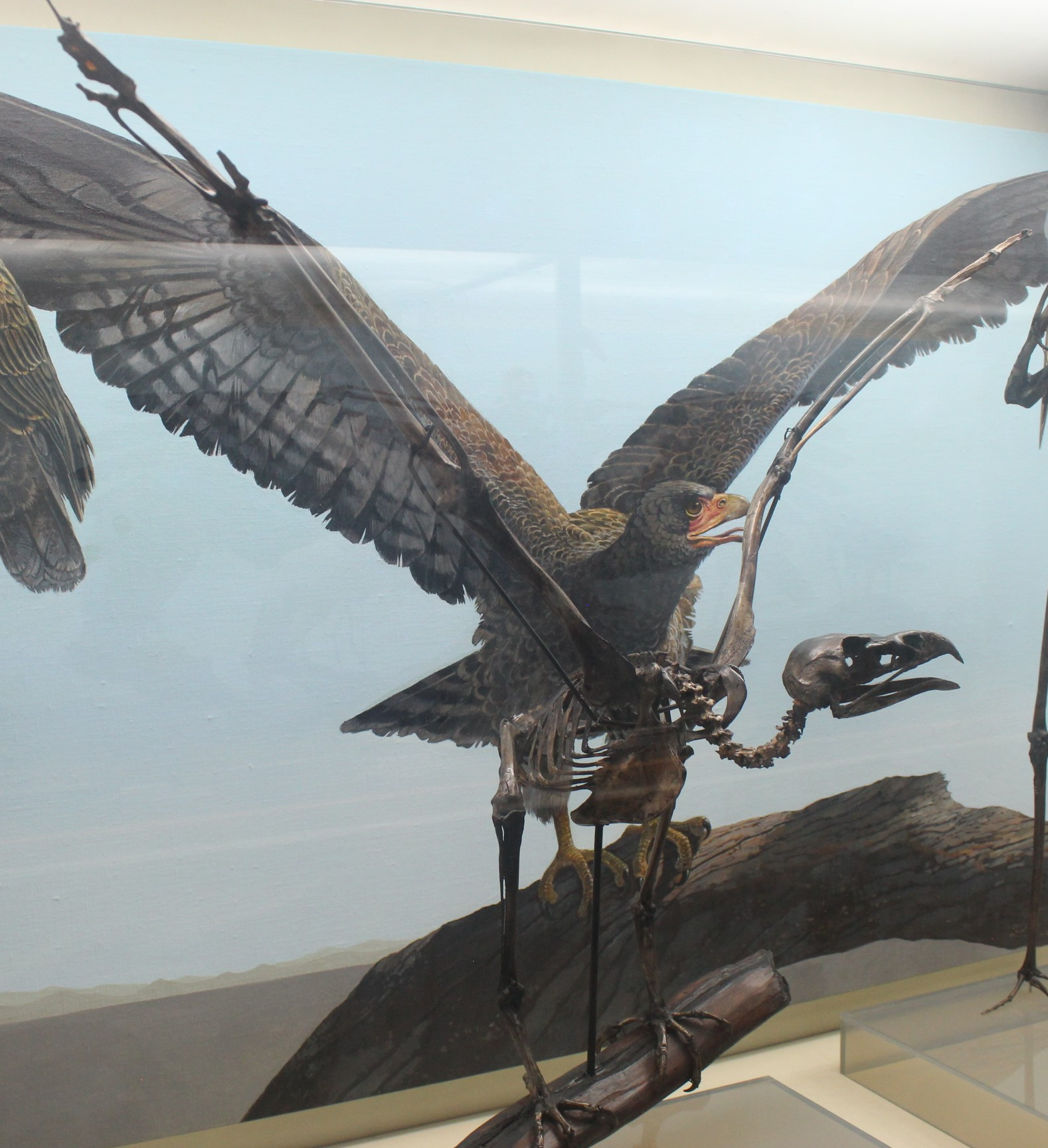
- Neogyps errans fossil

Scientific classification
- Kingdom: Animalia
- Phylum: Chordata
- Class: Aves
- Order: Accipitriformes
- Family: Accipitridae
- Subfamily: Gypaetinae
- Genus: †Neogyps; Miller, 1916
- Species: †N. errans

Binomial name
- †Neogyps errans Miller, 1916

= Neogyps =

Neogyps Temporal range: Pleistocene

Extinct genus of birds

Neogyps is an extinct monotypic genus of Old World vulture, represented by the sole species N. errans, occasionally referred to as the errant eagle. Despite its taxonomic placement among Old World vultures, Neogyps was native to the New World, with fossil remains known from western North America, including the La Brea Tar Pits in southern California. These remains date primarily to the Late Pleistocene. Several morphological characteristics suggest that Neogyps was closely related to the subfamily Gypaetinae.
