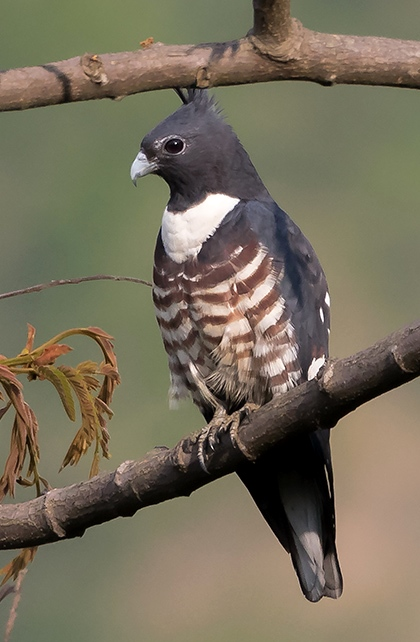
- At Mahananda Wildlife Sanctuary, India

Conservation status
- Least Concern (IUCN 3.1)

Scientific classification
- Kingdom: Animalia
- Phylum: Chordata
- Class: Aves
- Order: Accipitriformes
- Family: Accipitridae
- Genus: Aviceda
- Species: A. leuphotes

Binomial name
- Aviceda leuphotes (Dumont, 1820)
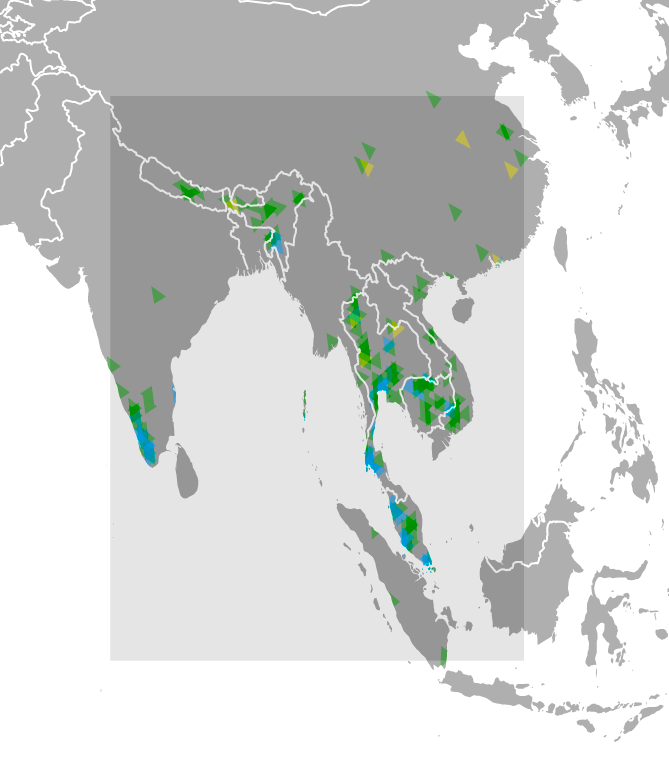
- Year-round range Summer range Winter range

Synonyms
- Falco leuphotes

= Black baza =

Species of bird

The black baza (Aviceda leuphotes) is a small bird of prey found in the forests of Northeast India, the eastern Himalayas, China and Southeast Asia. Many populations are migratory, including those in the Indian region, which winter in the south of the Peninsula and Sri Lanka. Black bazas have short, stout legs and feet with strong talons, and a prominent crest. They are found in dense forest, often in small groups, and can often be found perched on bare branches of tall trees rising above the forest canopy.

== Taxonomy and systematics ==
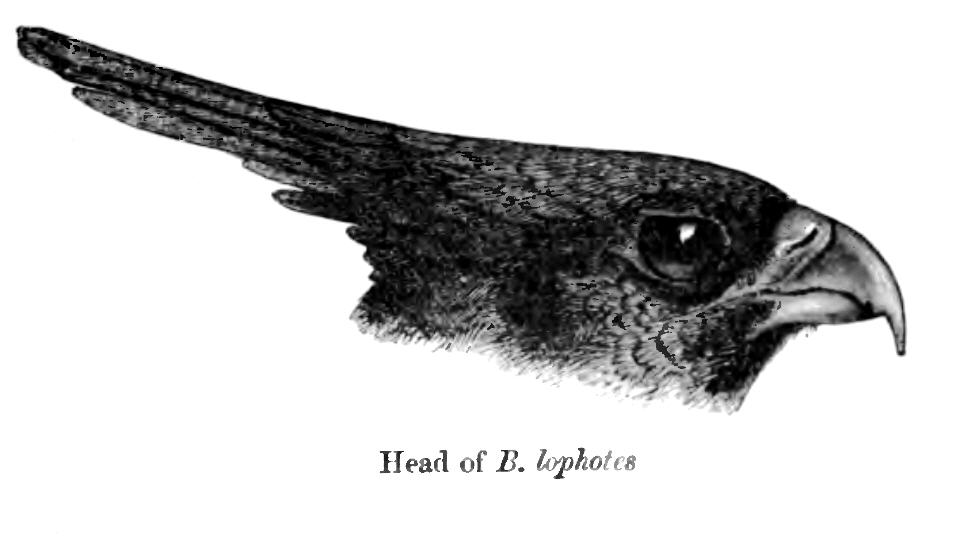
Characteristic "tooth" on the upper mandible

The bird was first described based on a specimen from Pondicherry under the name of Falco leuphotes. Several geographic races have been described including wolfei which is based on a single specimen from Sichuan and may belong to the nominate subspecies. The named forms include the following, but they have been questioned and further study has been called for.

- A. l. syama (Hodgson, 1837) from eastern Nepal, northeastern India to south China which winters in Indo-China and the Malaya Peninsula.
- A. l. leuphotes (Dumont, 1820) was once claimed to breed in South-Western India, but no evidence exists and this is doubtful. It is said to breed in Burma and Thailand, in which case it would likely be the same as syama, although the population in this region has in the past been assigned the name of burmana.
- A. l. andamanica (Abdulali & Grubh, 1970) is endemic to the Andaman Islands (South Andaman I) and has completely white underparts lacking any chestnut bands.

== Description ==
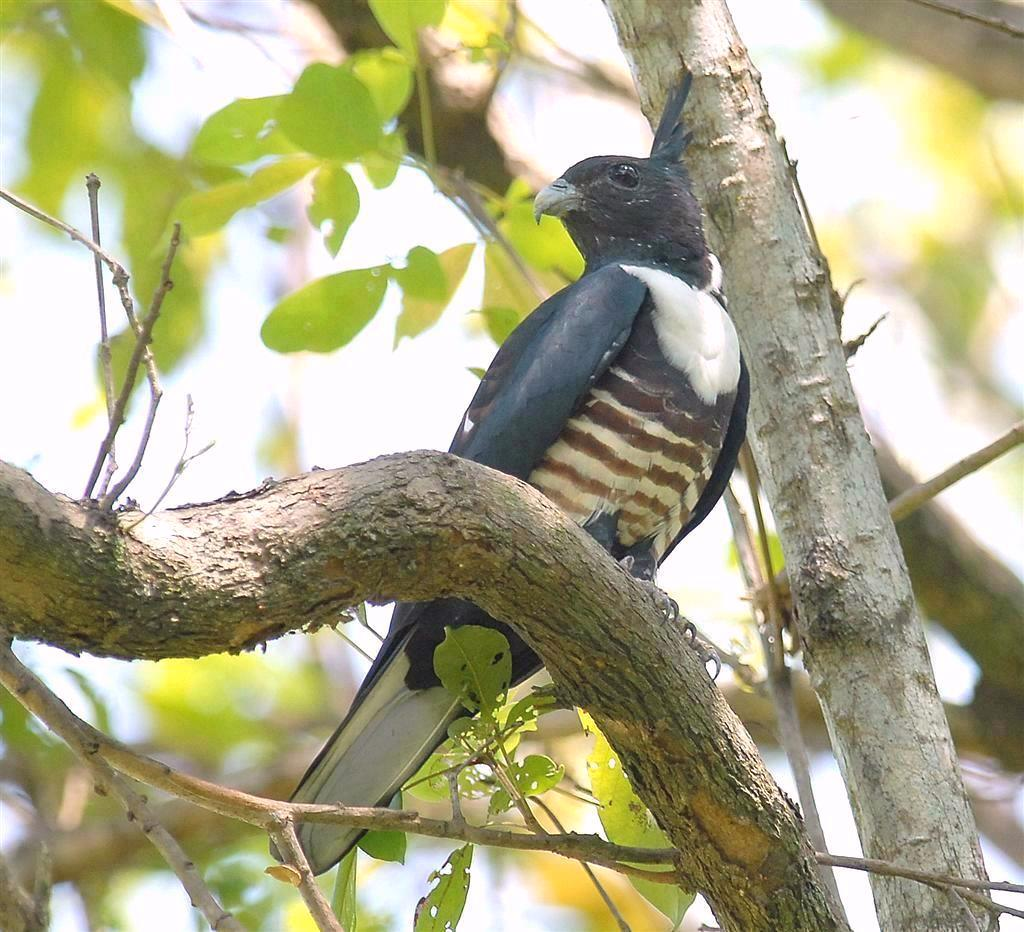
The crest is upright at rest

The black baza is a small and distinctively coloured raptor; it ranges from 30 to 35 cm in length, a 66 to 80 cm wingspan and a weight of 168 to 224 g. When perched, the upright crest and contrasting patterns make it difficult to misidentify. The male has white scapulars, secondary coverts and on the secondaries. The female has white only on the scapulars and more chestnut bands on the underside unlike the few bands in the male.

While flying, it is similar to a crow and is often seen in small groups or flocks during migration. During migration, they are gregarious at their roost. They are somewhat crepuscular and more active at dusk and in overcast weather.

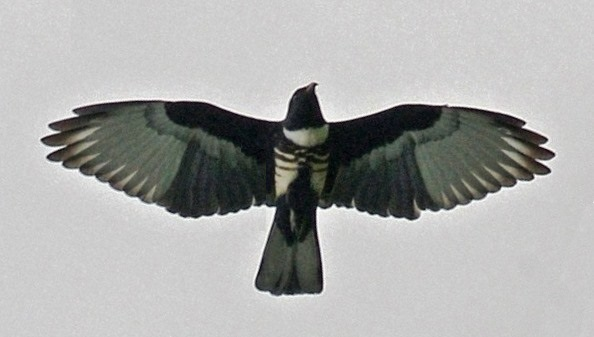
A ventral view in flight

They feed mainly on insects by making aerial sallies. They may also pick insects off a leaf, the insects always seized with their feet. They have been observed to attempt capturing small birds such as wagtails by making dashes into flocks. They have been noted to join mixed-species foraging flocks. It has also been known to feed on the fruits of the oil palm. They are somewhat crepuscular in habit. The call is a "chu-weep" somewhat similar to the call of the large cuckoo-shrike. Other descriptions include a soft squeal or whistle and a shrill gull-like mewing.

Like others in the genus Aviceda they have two tooth like indentations on the edge of the upper bill. Birds are said to have a disagreeable odour which has been described as "bug-like".

== Distribution ==
This species is found in Southeast Asia and parts of South Asia. They are migratory in parts of their range. Migratory birds may be seen in large numbers at some locations such as Chumphon in Thailand where they account for nearly 40% of the raptors on passage. In some parts of Hong Kong, they have established themselves in recent times changing from summer visitors to residents in small numbers.

In southern India the species is regularly reported in winter mainly from the Western Ghats (breeding records have been questioned), Eastern Ghats (mainly on spring passage) and known to breed in northeastern India and Burma. Winter records of the species include stray occurrences in or near metropolitan areas such as the Guindy National Park in Chennai, near Trivandrum and Bangalore. More recent studies have suggested that the species may be a regular winter visitor in the eastern part of peninsular India, and not just a passage migrant. Individuals have also been noted at Point Calimere.

The birds in northeastern India begin to breed in April. Both sexes take part in nest building, incubation, brooding and feeding. The nest is a firm platform of thin sticks with a central depression and lined with grass, fiber and overlaid with green leaves. The eggs take about 26–27 days to hatch. Insects are the predominant food of the chicks.

== Other sources ==
- Hussain, SA (1985) Comments on Mr Abdulali's note on Dr. Sugathan's paper on Avifauna of Point Calimere. J. Bombay Nat. Hist. Soc. 82(1):210–212.
- Inglis, CM (1948) Plumage of the young of the Indian Black-crested Baza. Jour. Bengal Nat. Hist. Soc. 23(1):73–75.
