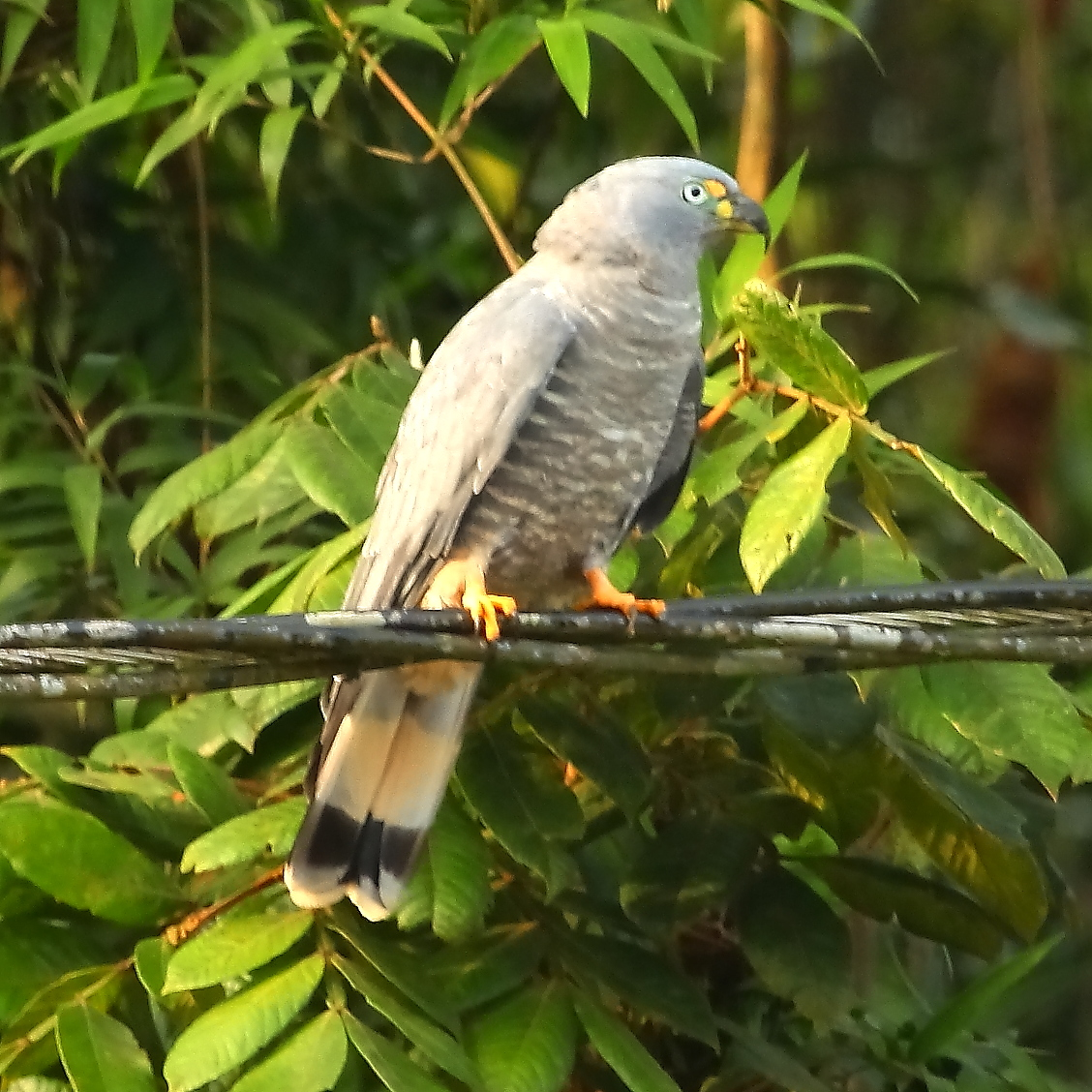
- Hook-billed kite (Chondrohierax uncinatus)

Scientific classification
- Kingdom: Animalia
- Phylum: Chordata
- Class: Aves
- Order: Accipitriformes
- Family: Accipitridae
- Subfamily: Perninae
- Genus: Chondrohierax; Lesson, 1843

Type species
- Daedalion erythrofrons Lesson, 1843

Species
- C. uncinatus C. wilsonii

= Chondrohierax =

Genus of birds

Chondrohierax is a genus of birds of prey in the family Accipitridae, with two species. The hook-billed kite is widespread in the warmer parts of the Americas, while the Cuban kite is a critically endangered Cuban endemic that is rarely seen.

== See also ==
- BirdLife International (2020). "Chondrohierax uncinatus". IUCN Red List of Threatened Species. 2020 e.T22694971A168997614. doi:10.2305/IUCN.UK.2020-3.RLTS.T22694971A168997614.en.
- BirdLife Species Factsheet
