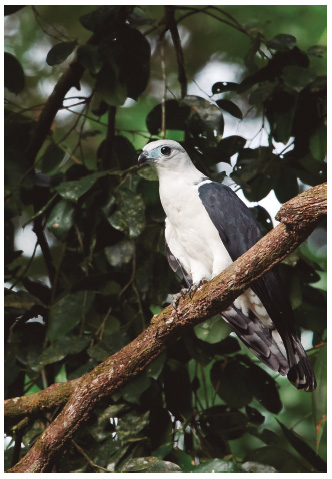

Conservation status
- Endangered (IUCN 3.1)
- CITES Appendix II (CITES)

Scientific classification
- Kingdom: Animalia
- Phylum: Chordata
- Class: Aves
- Order: Accipitriformes
- Family: Accipitridae
- Genus: Leptodon
- Species: L. forbesi

Binomial name
- Leptodon forbesi (Swann, 1922)
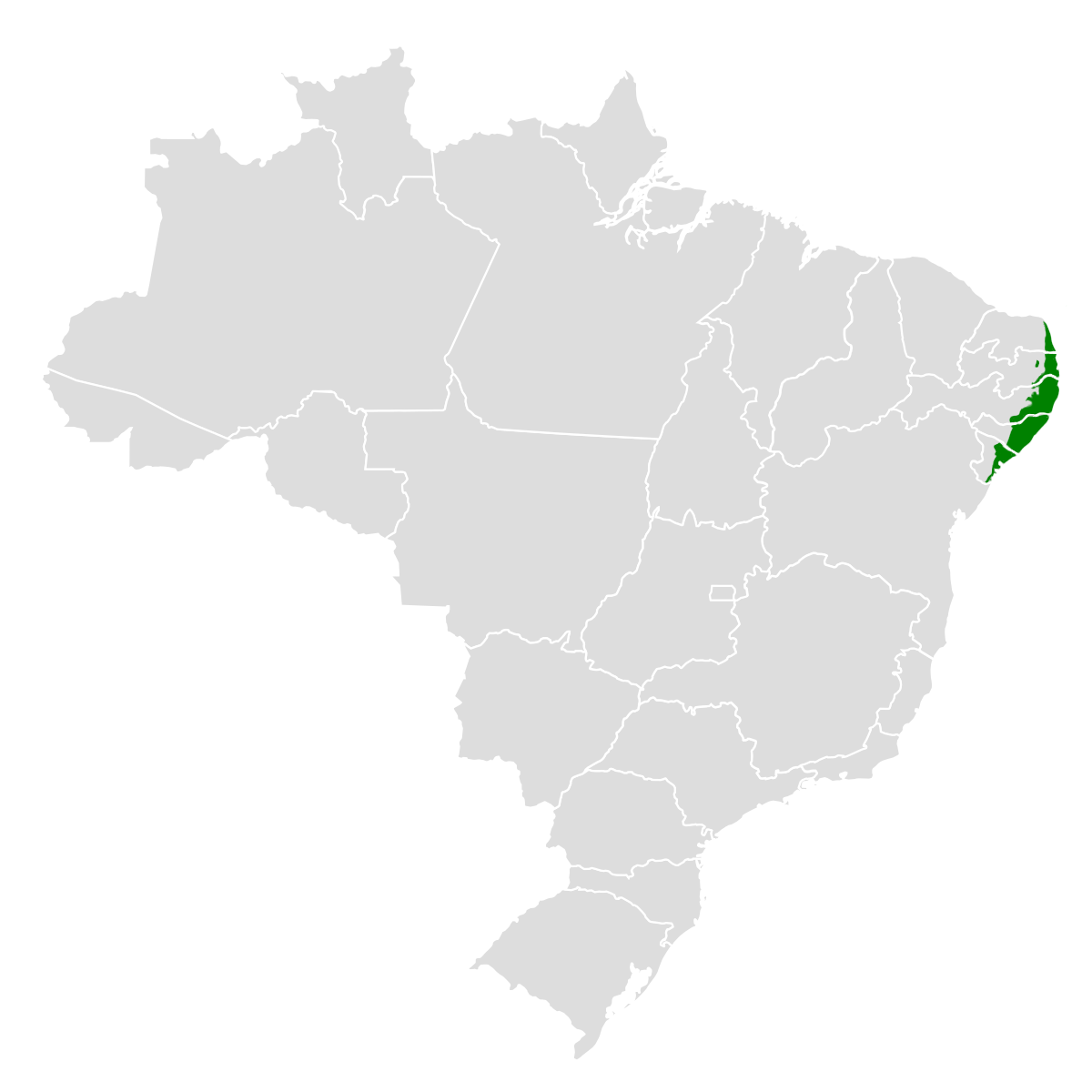
- White-collared kite range

= White-collared kite =

Species of bird

The white-collared kite (Leptodon forbesi) is an endangered species of bird in the subfamily Perninae of the family Accipitridae, the diurnal raptors. It is endemic to northeastern Brazil.

== Taxonomy and systematics ==
Until the early 2000s the white-collared kite was considered an aberrant plumage of the grey-headed kite (L. cayanensis) but morphological and other evidence strongly support its treatment as a full species. It is monotypic.

The species' specific epithet commemorates the British zoologist William Alexander Forbes.

== Description ==
The white-collared kite is about 50 cm (20 in) long and weighs 550 to 580 g (1.2 to 1.3 lb). Adults usually have a grey head with a white hindneck, but sometimes only the crown is gray and in other individuals the entire head is white. They have black upperparts, white underparts, and a black tail with a whitish tip and a broad ash-white band in the middle (or two white bands with a narrow black one between them). Their scapulars, secondaries, and inner primaries have broad white tips that are typically reduced or lost through wear.

== Distribution and habitat ==
The white-collared kite is found only in parts of four states of northeastern Brazil: eastern Paraíba, eastern Pernambuco, eastern Alagoas, and southern Sergipe. It primarily inhabits the Atlantic forest though it has been spotted over mangroves. In elevation it occurs from near sea level to 600 m (2,000 ft).

== Behavior ==
=== Movement ===
The white-collared kite is mostly sedentary but has been seen flying over sugar cane fields between isolated forest patches.

=== Feeding ===
Essentially nothing is known about the white-collared kite's hunting methods or diet. During the one documented observation the bird swooped from a perch, caught prey thought to be an insect, and returned to the same perch.

=== Breeding ===
The white-collared kite's breeding biology is almost unknown. Single birds and pairs have been observed making fluttering "butterfly" display flights between October and January, and an active nest was found in April.

=== Vocalization ===
The white-collared kite makes a flight call "kua-kua-kua-kua" and "a cat-like 'eeeAAW'" during the display flight.

== Status ==
The IUCN originally assessed the white-collared kite as Critically Endangered but since 2017 has rated it Endangered. It has a very small and fragmented range and its estimated population of between 250 and 1000 mature individuals is believed to be decreasing. Most of its original habitat has been cleared, primarily for agriculture, and small-scale logging continues in some of the remaining fragments. It is known from only about 30 sites, some of which are private preserves. Brazilian authorities consider it Endangered.
