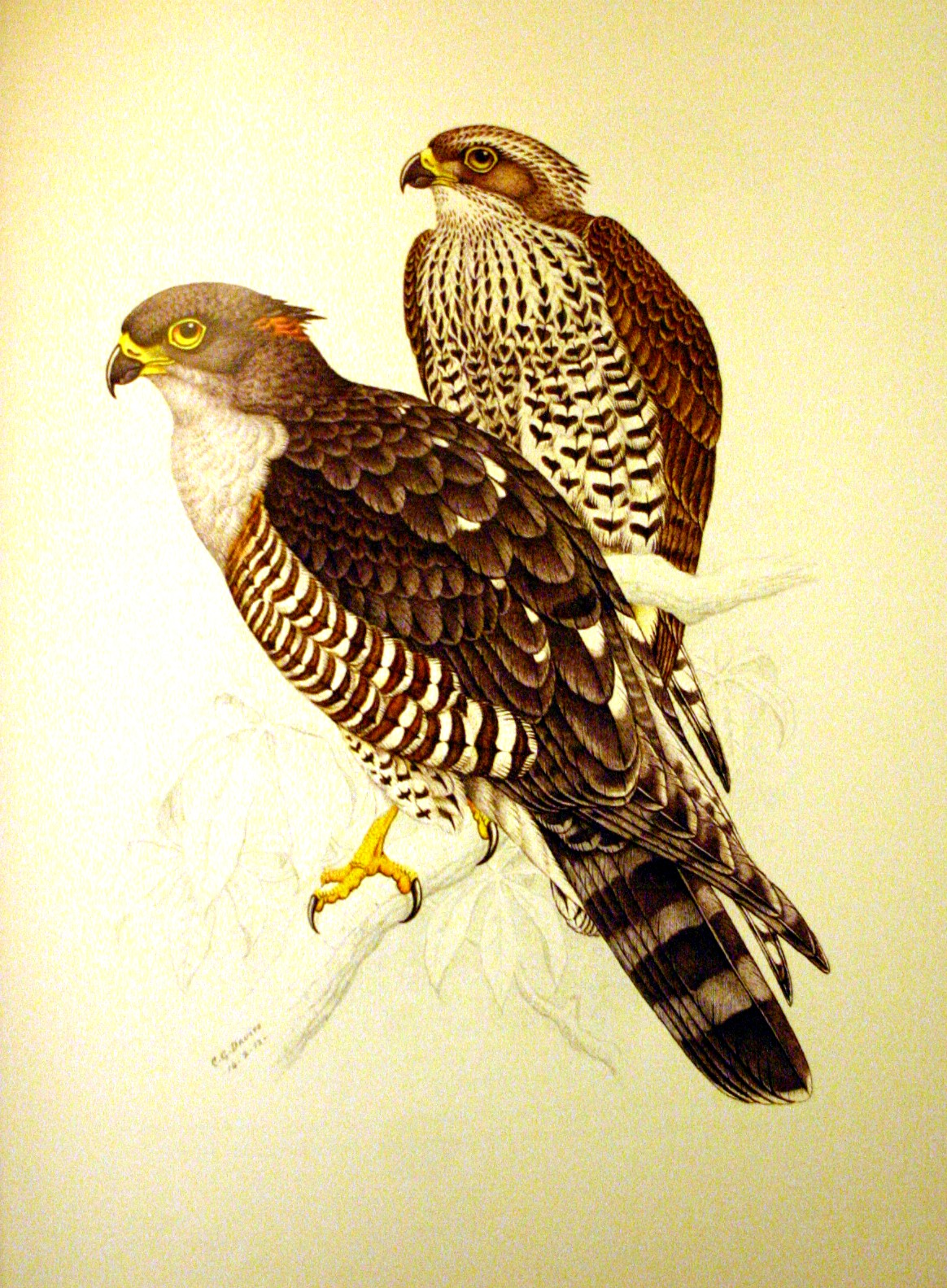

Conservation status
- Least Concern (IUCN 3.1)

Scientific classification
- Kingdom: Animalia
- Phylum: Chordata
- Class: Aves
- Order: Accipitriformes
- Family: Accipitridae
- Genus: Aviceda
- Species: A. cuculoides

Binomial name
- Aviceda cuculoides Swainson, 1837

Subspecies
- A. c. cuculoides - Swainson, 1837; A. c. batesi - (Swann, 1920); A. c. verreauxii - Lafresnaye, 1846

= African cuckoo-hawk =

Species of bird

The African cuckoo-hawk, or African baza (Aviceda cuculoides), is a medium-sized raptor in the family Accipitridae so named because it resembles the common cuckoo. It is found in sub-Saharan Africa and along the eastern parts of Southern Africa, preferring dense woodland and forest of either indigenous or exotic trees.

== Description ==
The African cuckoo-hawk weighs 220–296 grams (0.48–0.65 lb) and has a wingspan of 91 cm (35 inches). The male is blackish-brown above with a grey mantle and chest with a blackish crest, the underparts are white marked with broad chestnut bars. The tail is black with three grey bars and grey and white tip. The females are browner with paler chestnut bars on the underparts. Distinctive in flight as a small raptor with a small head with broad, narrowly rounded wings and a medium length tail. Wingspan is just over double the body length, females are slightly larger than males.

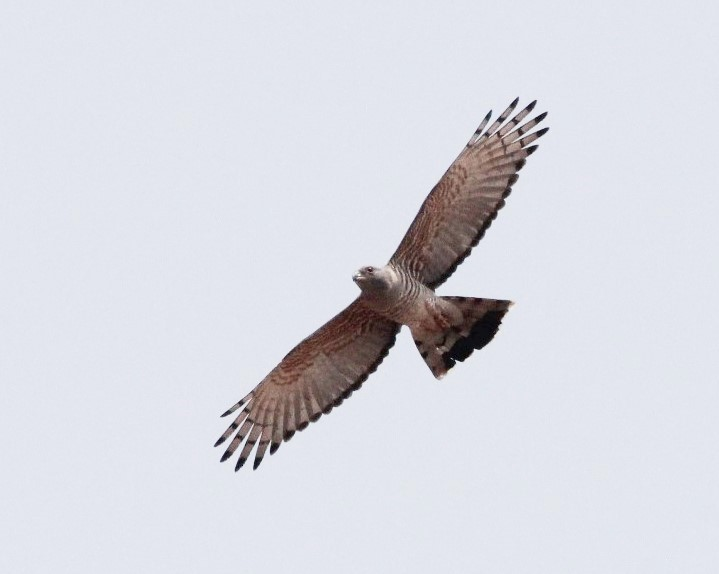
In flight

== Distribution and subspecies ==
The African cuckoo-hawk is found across much of sub-Saharan Africa, and the following subspecies are recognised:

- A. c. subsp. cuculoides – Senegal to southwestern Ethiopia and northern DRC
- A. c. subsp. batesi – Sierra Leone to Uganda and northern Angola
- A. c. subsp. verreauxii – Kenya to Namibia and eastern South Africa

== Habitat ==
The African cuckoo-hawk is a shy species which occurs in the interior and edges of evergreen forest and deciduous woodlands, including suburban gardens and more open savannas, up to 3,000 m (9,800 ft). When migrating through east Africa it also occurs in drier woodland and bush.

== Biology ==
The African cuckoo-hawk is largely sedentary but during April–November some migrate northwards to East Africa, in particular to coastal Kenya, and outside the breeding season some migrate to southern Africa, especially to the Transvaal Highveld. The breeding season varies by geography; in southern Africa breeding happens during September to March; in west Africa the season is June to August; while in Kenya there are two breeding periods per year, the first in March to June and the second from November to February, timed to follow the two rainy seasons. The African cuckoo-hawk's general behaviour is little known, as this species occurs at low densities and has secretive habits, although they are slightly more conspicuous during migration and so may appear more numerous.

The African cuckoo-hawk mainly eats reptiles and insects. It hunts within the canopy by flying from tree to tree, searching from a perch before flying to pluck the prey item from the canopy or ground. The following food items have been recorded in its diet: flap-necked chameleon Chamaeleo dilepsis, southern dwarf chameleon Brachypodion ventrale, lizards, snakes, frogs, fish, fruit bats, mice, birds, grasshoppers and locusts, stick insects, silverfish larvae, caterpillars, mantids and freshwater crabs.

The African cuckoo-hawk is a monogamous, solitary nester, belying its secretive reputation by performing spectacular aerial displays as the breeding season approaches. The nest is constructed by both sexes in 11 days and consists of an untidy platform of twigs, vines and leaves which is lined with leaves, grass and small sticks. It is normally placed in the highest branches of a tree, usually between 10 and 30 metres (33 and 98 ft) above the ground. Normally only one or two eggs are laid, occasionally three. The chicks are fed and brooded by both parents, before they leave the nest after 28 days and take their first flight a few days after that. The juveniles remain dependent on their parents for about a week after their first flight. Wahlberg's eagle Hieraaetus wahlbergi has been recorded preying on the chicks of the African cuckoo-hawk.
