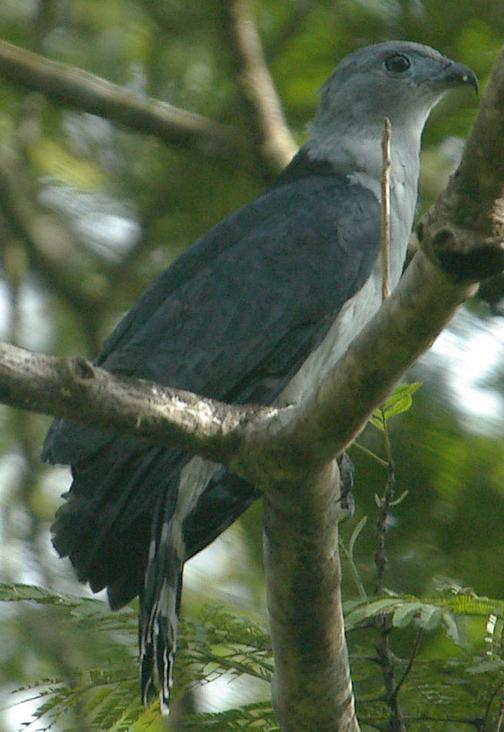
- Grey-headed kite (Leptodon cayanensis)

Scientific classification
- Kingdom: Animalia
- Phylum: Chordata
- Class: Aves
- Order: Accipitriformes
- Family: Accipitridae
- Subfamily: Perninae
- Genus: Leptodon; Sundevall, 1836

Type species
- Falco cayennensis Gmelin, 1789

Species
- L. cayanensis; L. forbesi

= Leptodon =

Genus of birds

Leptodon is a genus of birds of prey. Its two members are similar, with a grey head, black upperparts and white underparts.

== Species ==
Extant species include:

Genus Leptodon – Sundevall, 1836 – two species
Common name	Scientific name and subspecies	Range	Size and ecology	IUCN status and estimated population
Grey-headed kite	Leptodon cayanensis (Latham, 1790) Two subspecies: L. c. cayanensis - (Latham, 1790); L. c. monachus - (Vieillot, 1817)	eastern Mexico and Trinidad south to Peru, Bolivia, Brazil and northern Argentina.	Size: Habitat: Diet:	LC
White-collared kite	Leptodon forbesi (Swann, 1922)	northeastern Brazil.	Size: Habitat: Diet:	EN

The grey-headed kite is a widespread species, breeding from eastern Mexico and Trinidad south to Peru, Bolivia and northern Argentina. However, the white-collared kite is restricted to northeastern Brazil, and is classified as Critically Endangered.
