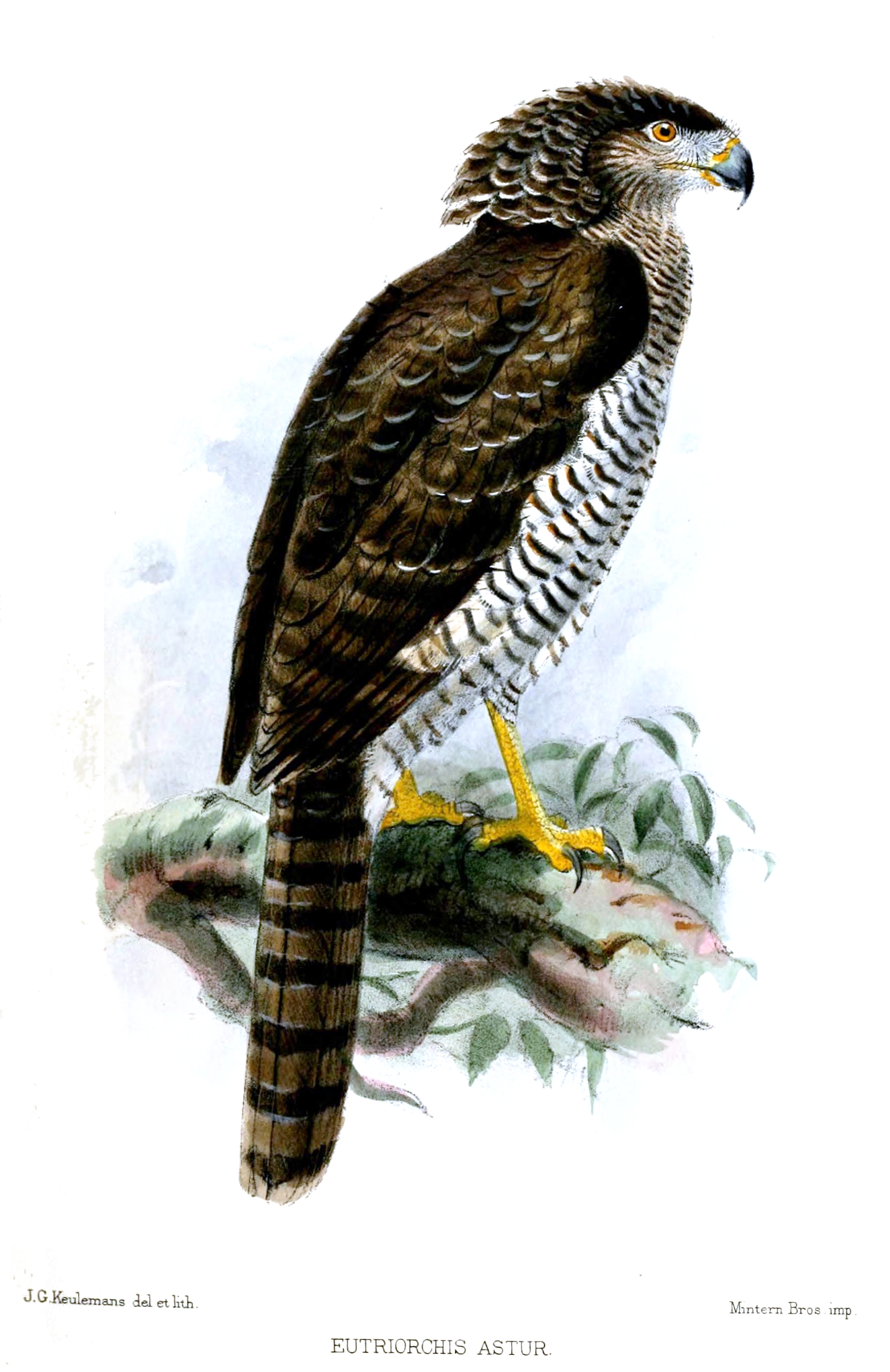

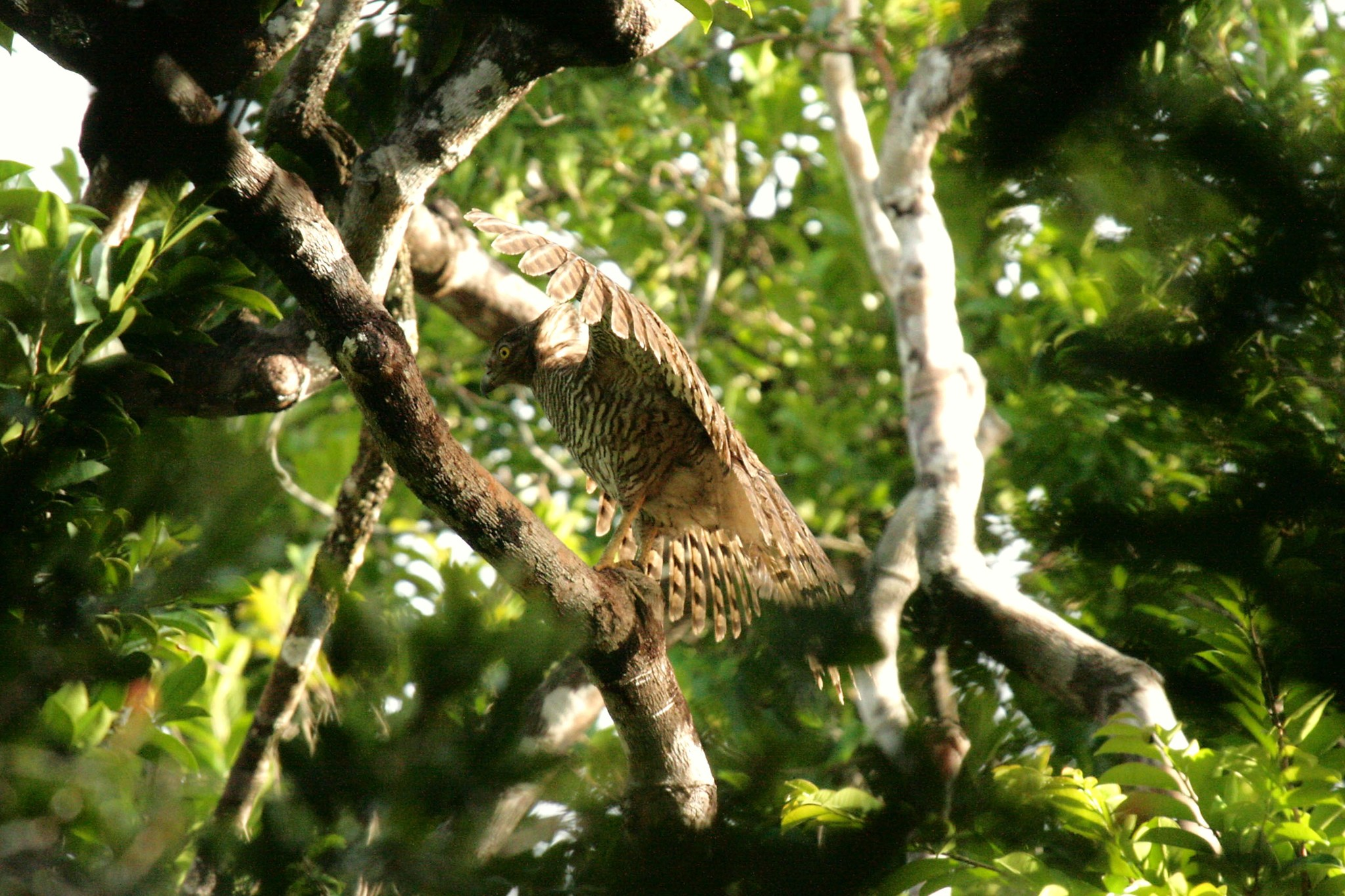

Conservation status
- Endangered (IUCN 3.1)

Scientific classification
- Kingdom: Animalia
- Phylum: Chordata
- Class: Aves
- Order: Accipitriformes
- Family: Accipitridae
- Subfamily: Circaetinae
- Genus: Eutriorchis; Sharpe, 1875
- Species: E. astur

Binomial name
- Eutriorchis astur Sharpe, 1875

= Madagascar serpent eagle =

Species of bird

The Madagascar serpent eagle (Eutriorchis astur) is a species of bird of prey in the family Accipitridae. It is placed in the monotypic genus Eutriorchis. It is endemic to Madagascar. Its natural habitat is subtropical or tropical moist lowland forests. It is threatened by habitat loss.

== Description ==
The Madagascar serpent eagle is a medium-sized raptor with a long rounded tail and short rounded wings. It is dark grey on its back and a lighter grey on its belly, breast, and throat. Dark barring covers the bird's body. It has yellow eyes and a sharp, hooked beak with strong talons. It measures 57 to 66 cm (22 to 26 in) long with a wingspan of 90 to 110 cm (35 to 43 in).

== Distribution and habitat ==
This bird inhabits dense, humid, and broadleafed evergreen forests in northeastern and east-central Madagascar. It rarely ventures above 550 meters (1800 ft).

== Ecology and behavior ==
This serpent-eagle is diurnal. It eats lemurs both large and small, snakes, lizards, and frogs, which it hunts from high perches, swooping down from its perch and grasping its prey in its talons when it spots it.

== Conservation ==
This species was believed to be extinct, with the last confirmed sighting being from 1930. However, sightings in 1977 and 1988 led to hope for the species' rediscovery. It was rediscovered in 1993 by the Peregrine Fund.

The Madagascar serpent eagle is listed as an endangered species on the International Union for Conservation of Nature (IUCN) Red List, with an estimated population from one source of 533 adults. As of 2025, the IUCN estimates a total population of 1,000 – 2,150 mature individuals. This species is threatened by the destruction of its specialized habitat and a presumed low rate of reproduction.

== Etymology ==
The prefix eu- is Greek for "good","well","true", and "pleasant". Tri Orchis is a Latinization (Pliny the Elder) of Greek triórkhēs (τριόρχης), which Aristotle and Theophrastus used for a kind of hawk, possibly the common buzzard. The Greek word means "having three testicles". This erroneous bit of anatomy has been connected with the ease of mistaking a bird's adrenal gland for a testicle.

Astur is Latin for a kind of hawk.
