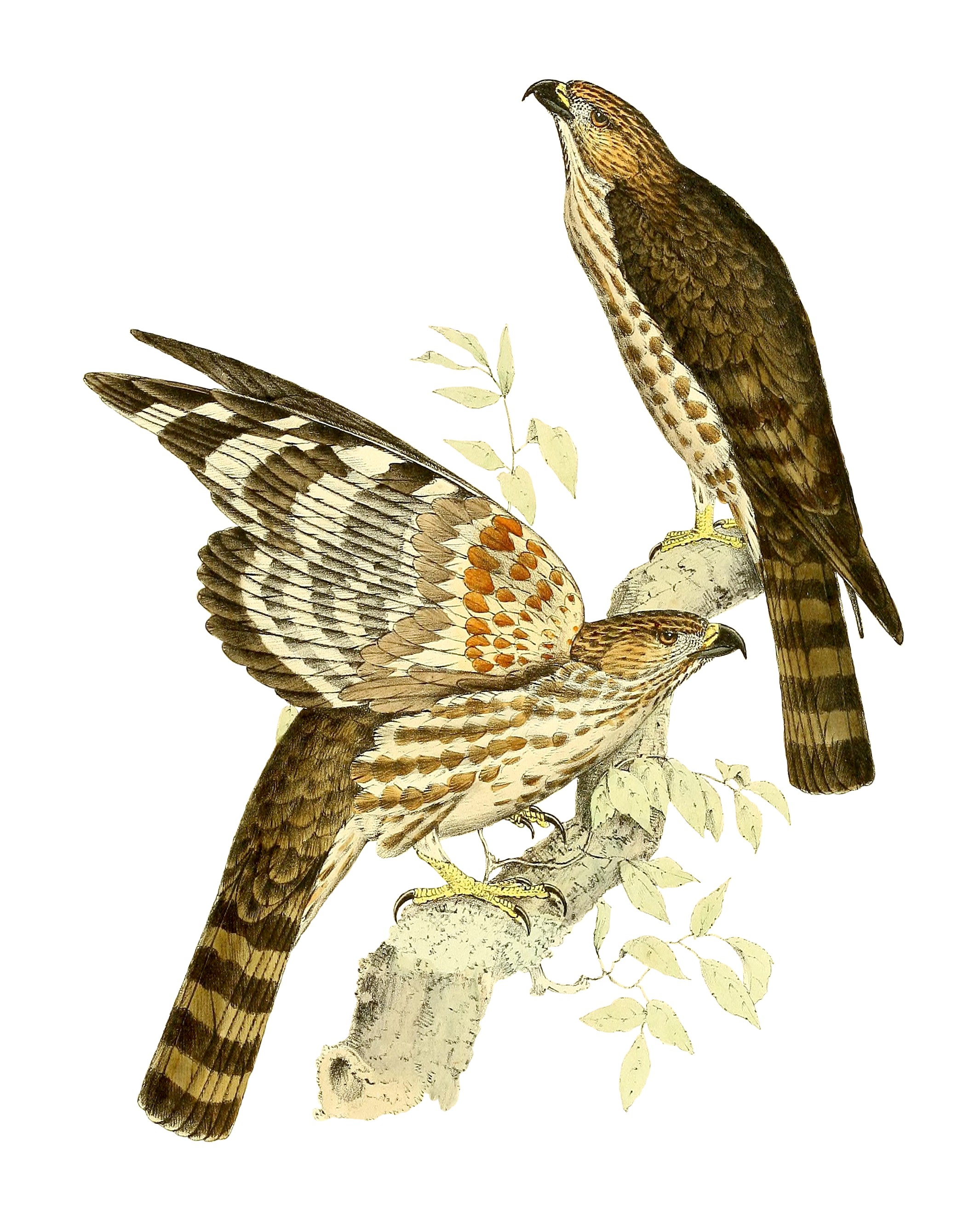

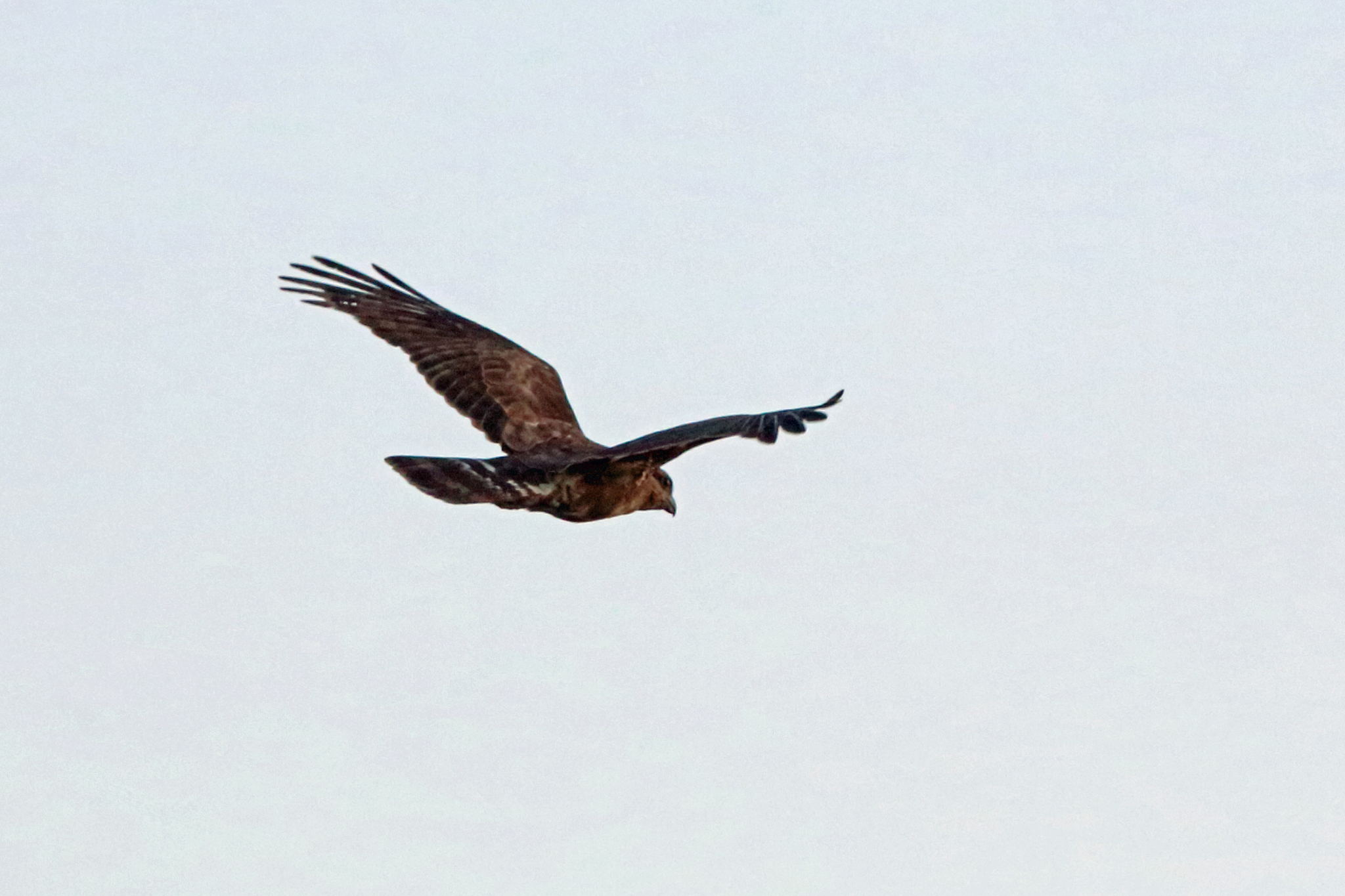
- In flight

Conservation status
- Least Concern (IUCN 3.1)

Scientific classification
- Kingdom: Animalia
- Phylum: Chordata
- Class: Aves
- Order: Accipitriformes
- Family: Accipitridae
- Genus: Aviceda
- Species: A. madagascariensis

Binomial name
- Aviceda madagascariensis (Smith, 1834)
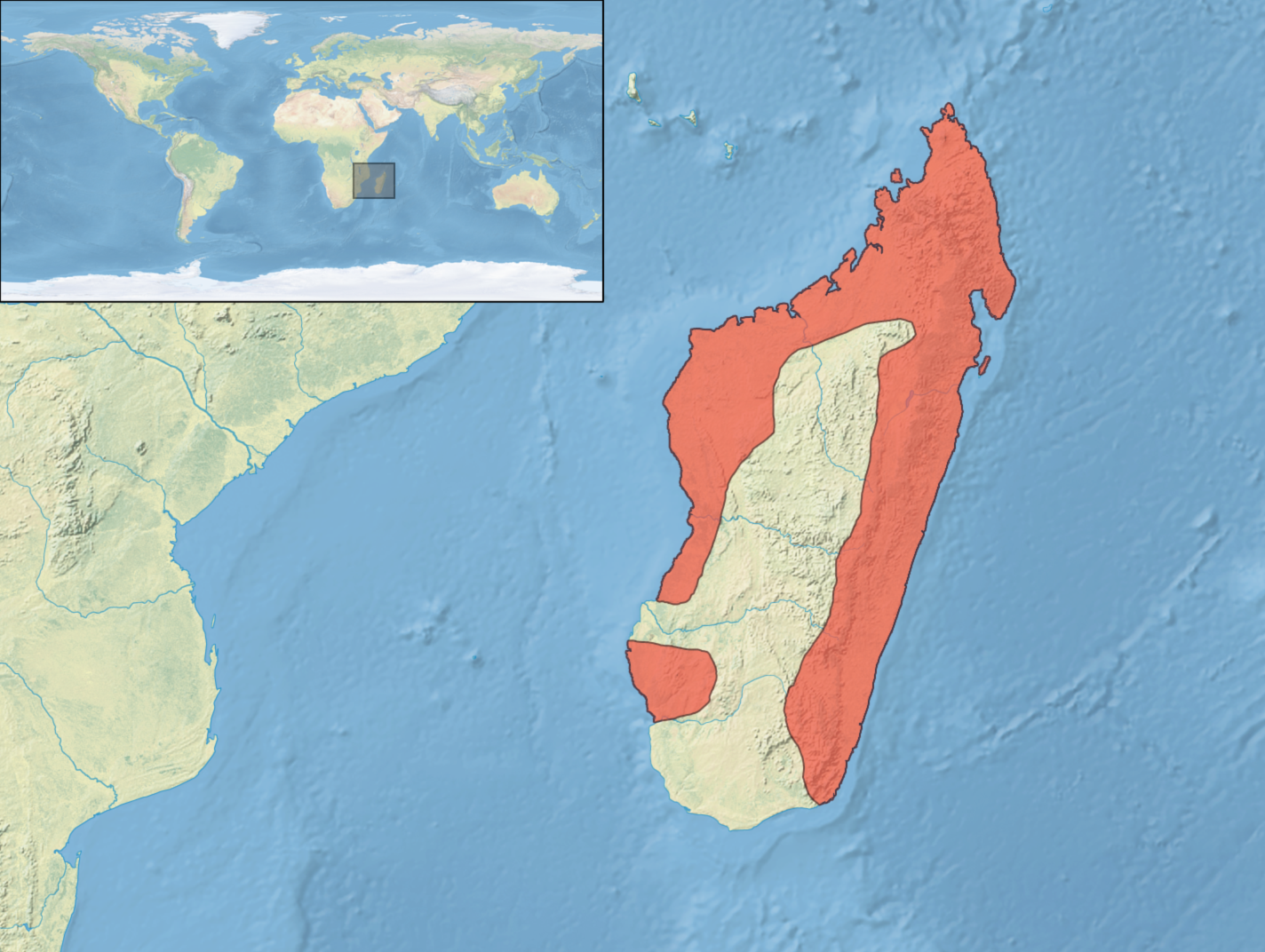
- Range

= Madagascar cuckoo-hawk =

Species of bird

The Madagascar cuckoo-hawk (Aviceda madagascariensis), also known as the Madagascar baza or the Madagascan cuckoo falcon, is a species of bird of prey in the family Accipitridae. It is endemic to Madagascar.

== Description ==
The adult Madagascar cuckoo-hawk has dark brown upperparts which are paler on the head and an off white rump. The underparts are white with the breast and upper breast and sides of the lower breast are heavily streaked with brown, these streaks becoming finer on the flanks, The tail has two narrow, pale bars and a pale tip. The underwing coverts are heavily barred with brown while the flight feathers have broad dark bands on their underside. At rest there is a short crest which projects from the rear crown. The juvenile is darker than the adult with white tips to the feathers obvious against the dark upperparts. Males and females are similar in size with a length of 300 mm (12 in) and a wingspan of 850 mm (33 in).

== Distribution ==
The bird is endemic to Madagascar where it is reasonably common in the west, the north, and the east of the island. However, it is rather uncommon in the south and on the Central Plateau.

== Habitat ==
In Madagascar this species is found in most forest types, including commercial plantations of coconut and other palms. It has been recorded from sea level to 1,600 m (5,200 ft) in altitude. Most observation are made at the edges of forests or in clearings, it can also be seen in towns. It avoids the densest forests and the most arid or deforested areas in the south and the central plateau.

== Habits ==
The Madagascar cuckoo-hawk spends a lot of the day perched while searching for insects and lizards and other small vertebrates. Chameleons and geckoes make up the majority of its diet but it also takes nestlings and larger insects such as locusts. It is most active at dawn and dusk but is apparently uncommon and rarely soars, being most often observed flying between patches of trees with its typical flight of deep flaps interspersed with glides. Breeding has been recorded in November and December when the nest was situated at the top of a tree which was 14m tall and located in an area of degraded forest adjacent to a marsh.
