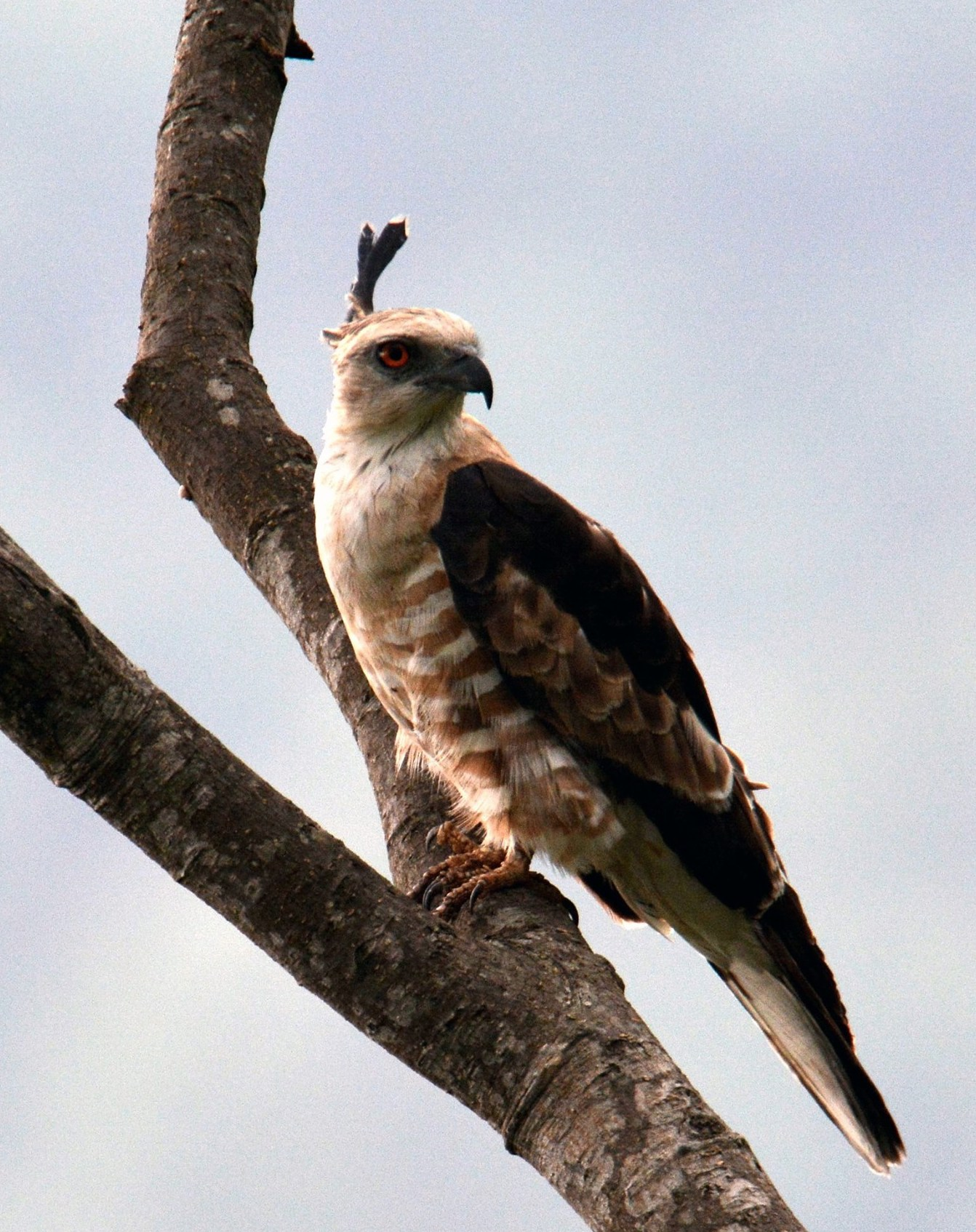

Conservation status
- Least Concern (IUCN 3.1)

Scientific classification
- Kingdom: Animalia
- Phylum: Chordata
- Class: Aves
- Order: Accipitriformes
- Family: Accipitridae
- Genus: Aviceda
- Species: A. jerdoni

Binomial name
- Aviceda jerdoni (Blyth, 1842)

= Jerdon's baza =

Species of bird

Jerdon's baza (Aviceda jerdoni) is a moderate sized brown hawk with a thin white-tipped black crest usually held erect. It is found in South-east Asia. It inhabits foothills in the terai and is rarer in evergreen forests and tea estates.

The common name and Latin binomial commemorate the surgeon-naturalist Thomas C. Jerdon.

== Description ==
It is about 41–48 cm long with a wingspan of 117 cm (46 in). The bird weighs around 350 grams (.77 lb). It is confusable with crested goshawk or the changeable hawk-eagle in flight, but can be distinguished by the longer upright crest, very broad and rounded paddle-shaped wings and mostly plain and pale underparts. It has a white chin and a bold black mesial stripe.

Several subspecies are recognized within its large distribution range. These include:

- A. j. jerdoni (Blyth, 1842) – Sikkim to Assam, Burma, Sumatra
- A. j. ceylonensis (Legge, 1876) – South India and Sri Lanka
- A. j. borneensis (Sharpe, 1893) – Borneo
- A. j. magnirostris (Kaup, 1847) – Luzon, Mindanao
- A. j. leucopias (Sharpe, 1888) – Romblon, Samar, Palawan
- A. j. celebensis (Schlegel, 1873)

== Distribution ==
It is a resident of the terai of North India and foothills of the Eastern Himalayas from Eastern Nepal and Bengal duars to the Assam valley, Western Ghats in Southern India, southern Sri Lanka, Bangladesh, Burma, Thailand, Sumatra, Singapore and Philippines

== Habits ==
The bird is typically seen in pairs making aerial sallies; crest held erect. Occasionally, the birds may be seen in small family parties of 3 to 5 seen in flight near edge of forests. The birds indulge in 'soaring and undulating' display flights near the nest. Breeding season varies locally but the bird is known to breed almost the entire year with the exception of a few months around April and May. 2 – 3 eggs are laid, young are dependent on their parents for some time after fledgling. Food includes lizards, grasshoppers and other large insects. The stomach contents of a specimen collected in present-day Kurseong included agamid lizard, Japalura variegata, several longicorn beetles and mantises.

== Gallery ==
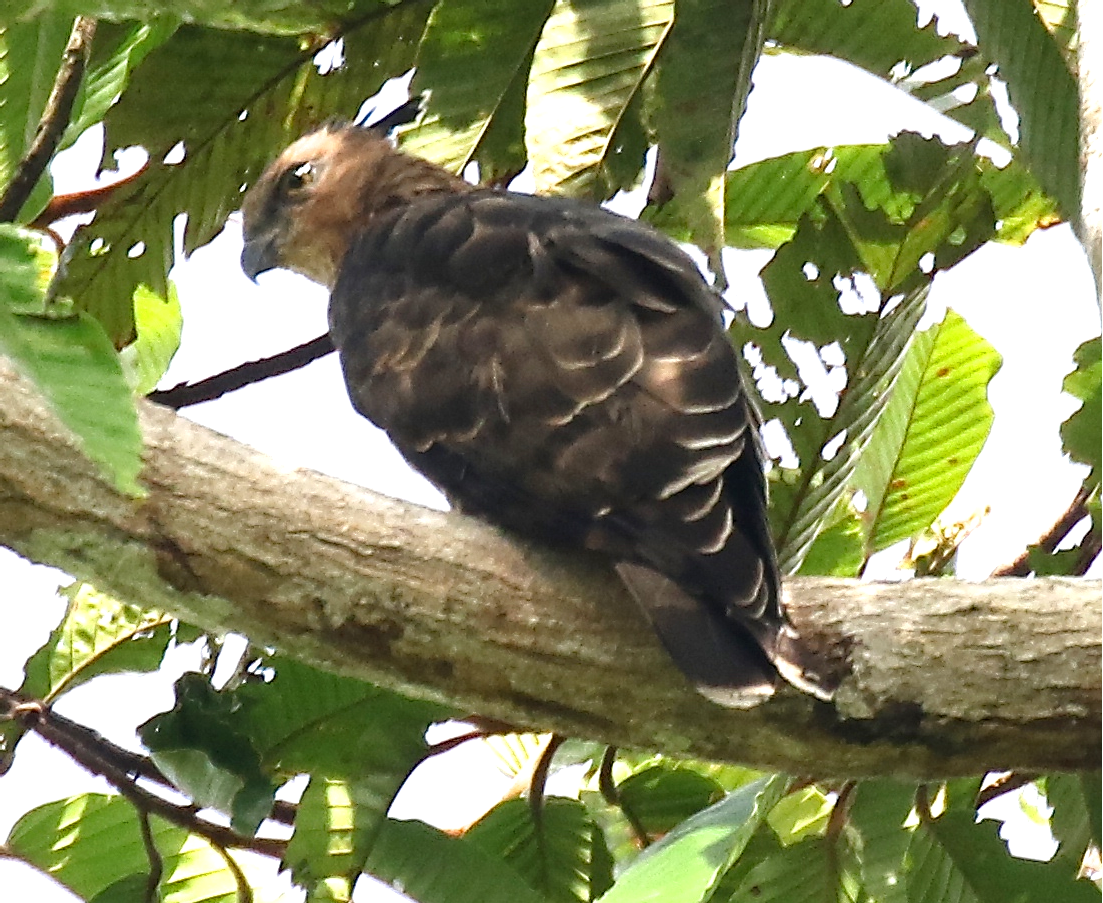
A. j. celebensis

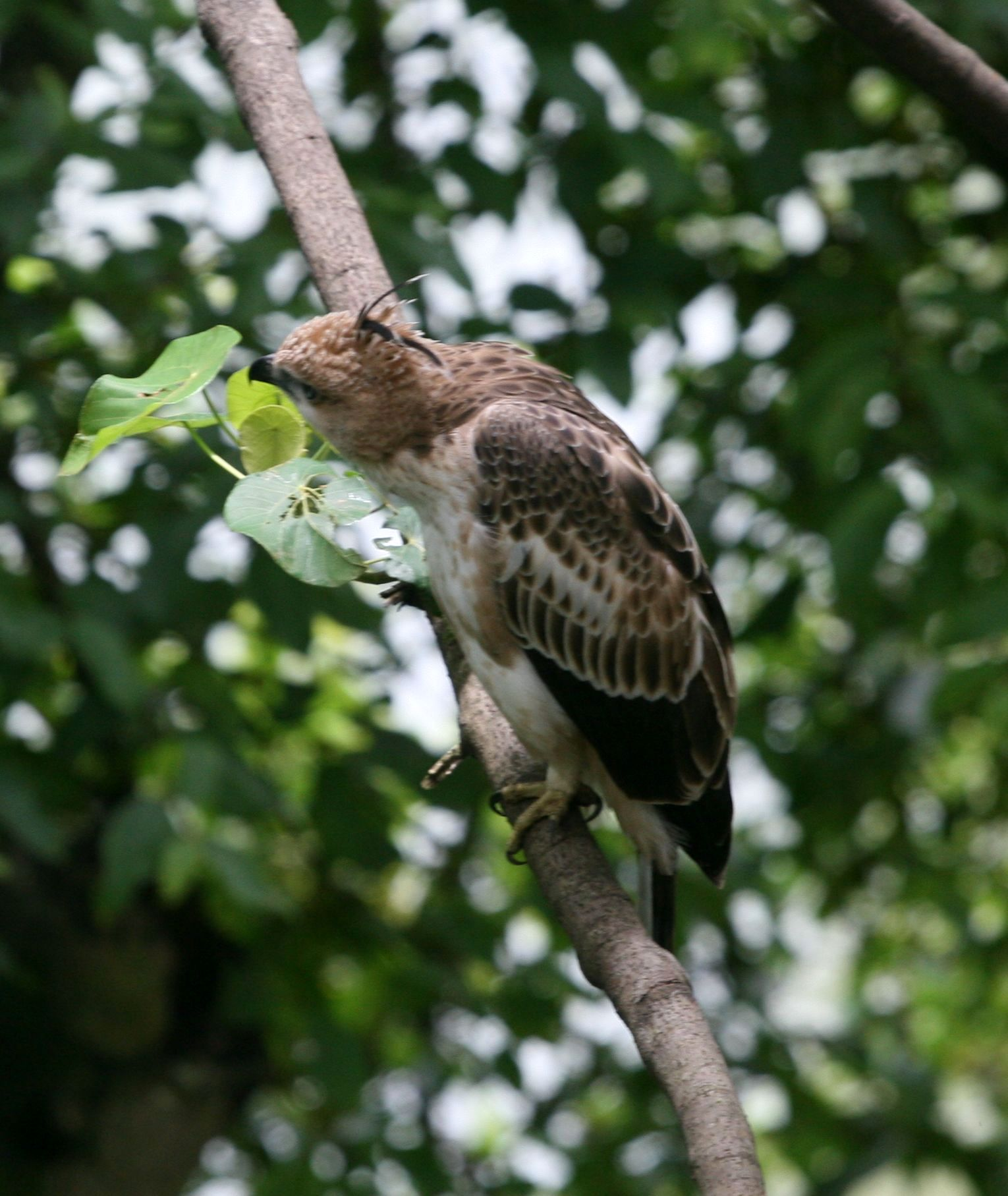
A. j. ceylonensis

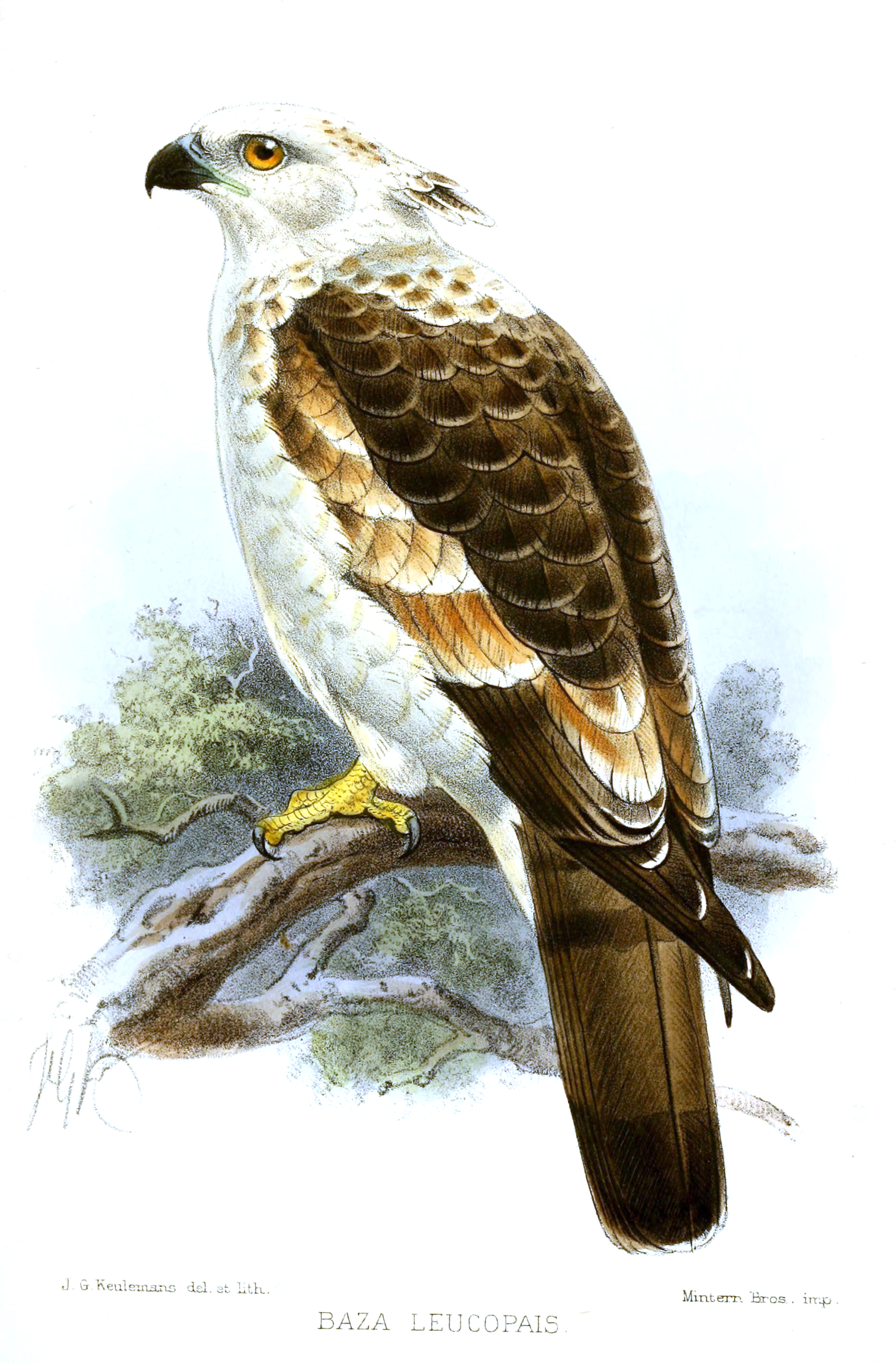
A. j. leucopias

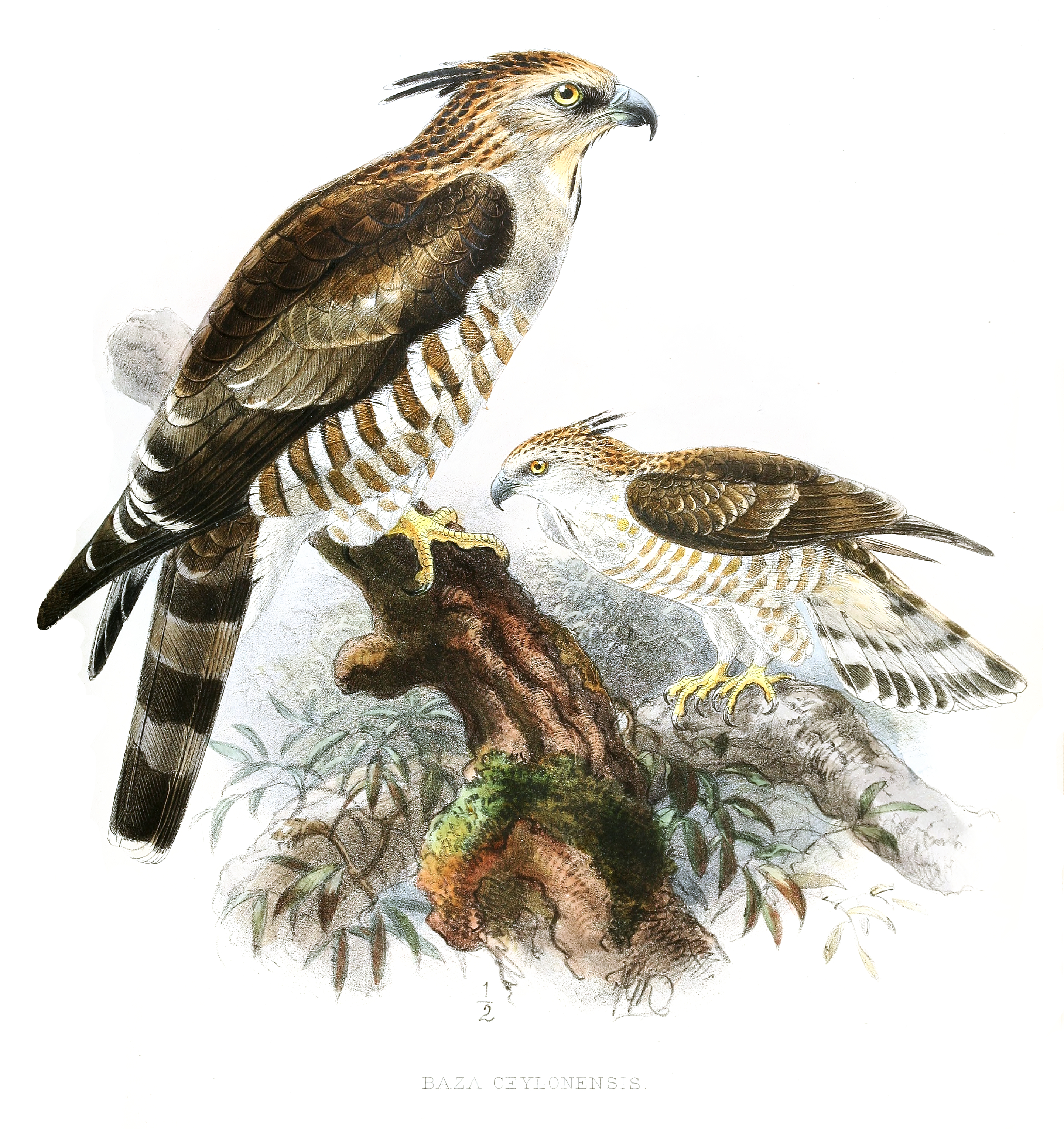
