= Cuban kite =

Conservation status
- Critically Endangered (IUCN 3.1)
- CITES Appendix I

Scientific classification
- Kingdom: Animalia
- Phylum: Chordata
- Class: Aves
- Order: Accipitriformes
- Family: Accipitridae
- Genus: Chondrohierax
- Species: C. wilsonii

Binomial name
- Chondrohierax wilsonii (Cassin, 1847)

Critically endangered species of bird

The Cuban kite (Chondrohierax wilsonii) is a bird of prey in the family Accipitridae which also includes many other diurnal raptors such as kites, eagles and harriers. The species was originally described in 1847 by John Cassin from material at The Academy of Natural Sciences of Philadelphia. It is endemic to Cuba.

The Clements Checklist considered it as subspecies of the hook-billed kite until its 2022 revision. A molecular phylogenetics analysis using mitochondrial DNA suggests that it warrants species status having diverged from the mainland lineage approximately 400,000 to 1.5 million years ago.

== Description ==
The Cuban kite is slightly smaller than the hook-billed kite. Males have gray upperparts, black bars on the tail, and the underparts evenly barred grayish and white. Females resemble the Grenada form of hook-billed kite, but the brown barring on the underparts is less rufescent. The bill of Cuban kite is yellowish, in contrast to hook-billed kite's mostly dark bill. The genus name Chondrohierax comes from the Greek meaning cartilage hawk.

== Distribution ==
In the 20th century the Cuban kite was only reported in the Sagua-Baracoa mountain range in the provinces of Holguín, from which the species was originally described, Santiago de Cuba, and Guantánamo. Recent studies indicate that the species is now restricted to small areas in the east of Cuba, near Moa and Baracoa, and possibly some other parts of Holguín and Guantánamo. Lives in tall trees of forests bordering rivers below 500 m (1640 ft).

== Behavior ==
Cuban kites feed on colored tree snails (possibly of the genera: Zachrysia,Coryda, and Polymita) and slugs (possibly of the genus Veronicella), which they find in the forest undergrowth, for which the deeply hooked bill is thought to be adapted. Their perches are often found identified by nearby piles of snail shells and feces.

== Conservation threats ==
This species is classified as critically endangered by BirdLife International and the IUCN. The current population is estimated 50 to 249 mature birds. In the last 40 years the species has only been observed a handful of times with the latest published sighting in 2010 in Alejandro de Humboldt National Park. The rarity of sightings has led to growing concern of that the species is functionally extinct.

Forest destruction and degradation, especially along riparian corridors is the leading cause of population decline, as well as the reduction in prey snail numbers and persecution by local farmers. Local farmers see the birds as a threat to their poultry likely because they mistake it for other raptor species. Its apparently tame nature makes it an easy target for shooters.
