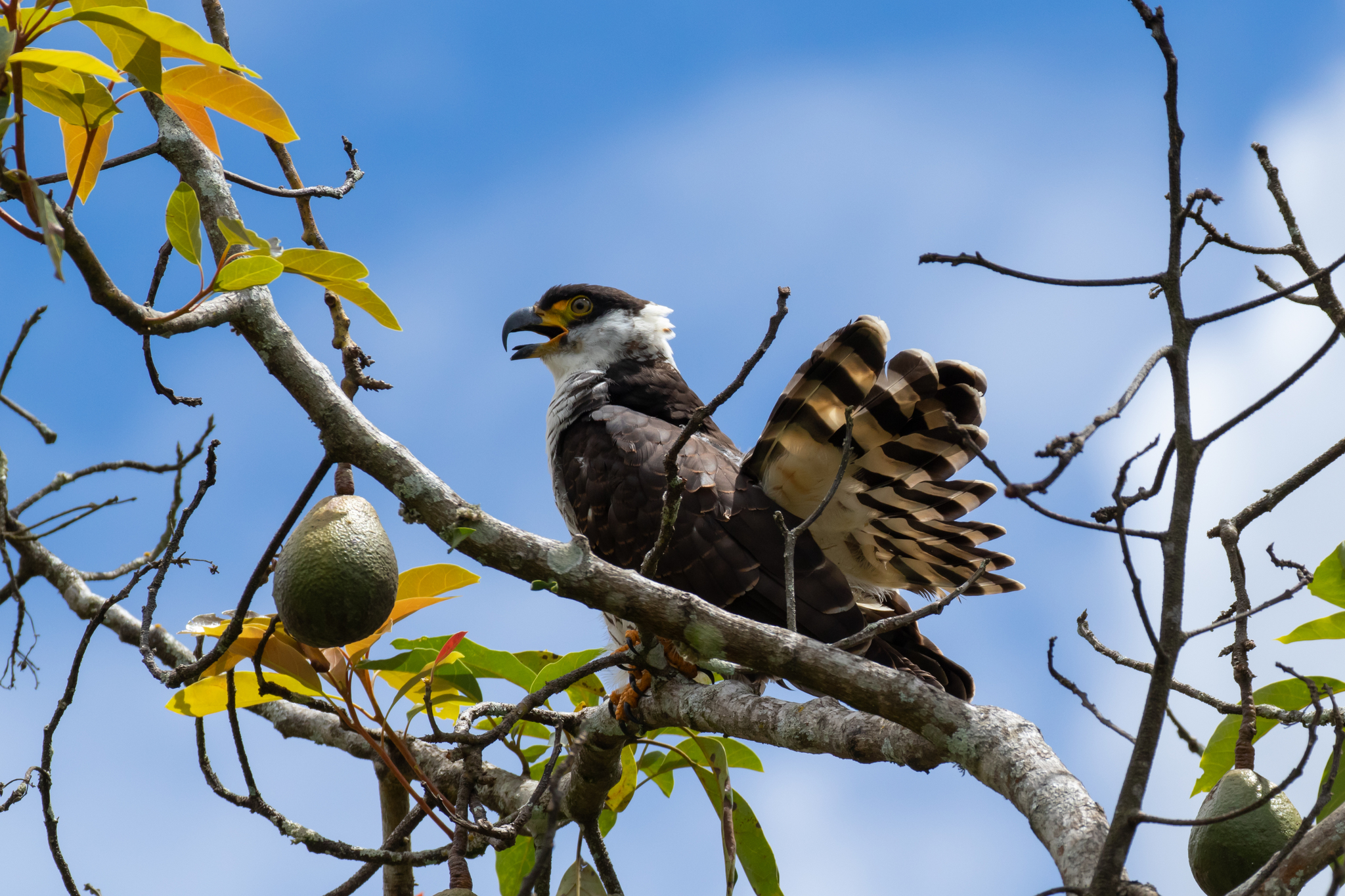
- Hook-billed kite in Pasco, Peru
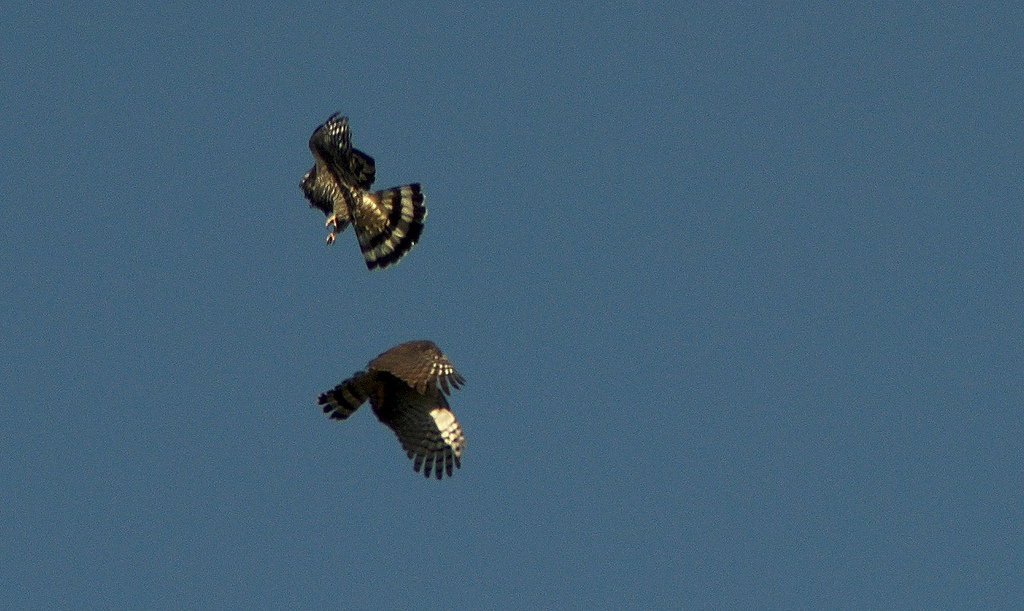

Conservation status
- Least Concern (IUCN 3.1)

Scientific classification
- Kingdom: Animalia
- Phylum: Chordata
- Class: Aves
- Order: Accipitriformes
- Family: Accipitridae
- Genus: Chondrohierax
- Species: C. uncinatus

Binomial name
- Chondrohierax uncinatus (Temminck, 1822)

Subspecies
- C. u. uncinatus - (Temminck, 1822); C. u. mirus - Friedmann, 1934

= Hook-billed kite =

Species of bird

The hook-billed kite (Chondrohierax uncinatus), is a bird of prey in the family Accipitridae, which also includes many other diurnal raptors such as kites, eagles, and harriers. It occurs in the Americas, including the Rio Grande Valley of Texas in the United States, Mexico, the Caribbean, Central America, and tropical South America.

== Description ==
It is a mid-sized, slender raptor with a large hooked bill. There is extreme variation in bill size and plumage. Birds from beneath can look blackish or gray (especially males) and brown or brick-red (females) variously. This renders species identification at times extremely difficult. The downcurved hook at the tip of the beak is apparent on perched and low-flying birds. Weight can range from 215 to 397 g (7.6 to 14.0 oz) and length is 38–42 cm (15–16.5 in).

== Ecology ==
Tree snails (e.g. Bulimulus, Homolanyx, and Polymita) are a vital component of the hook-billed kite's diet. The density of their population within a region is proportional to the presence of tree snails. It has also been observed that the beak of the hook-billed kite has adapted in size and shape between different regions of their territory in response to the species of tree snail available to them. However, terrestrial snails (e.g. Strophocheilus), aquatic snails (e.g. Pomacea), frogs, salamanders, lizards, small mammals, crabs, spiders, caterpillars, and insects are also taken. It supposedly also hunts other birds, but this seems unlikely. When it finds a tree snail it holds it with its talon and uses its beak to pry open the shell.

== Breeding ==
1–2 eggs are laid in the shallow and small nest. Incubation time of around 35 days, both parents incubate.

== Taxonomy ==
The critically endangered Cuban kite (C. wilsonii) is considered by some authors to be a subspecies of the hook-billed kite.
