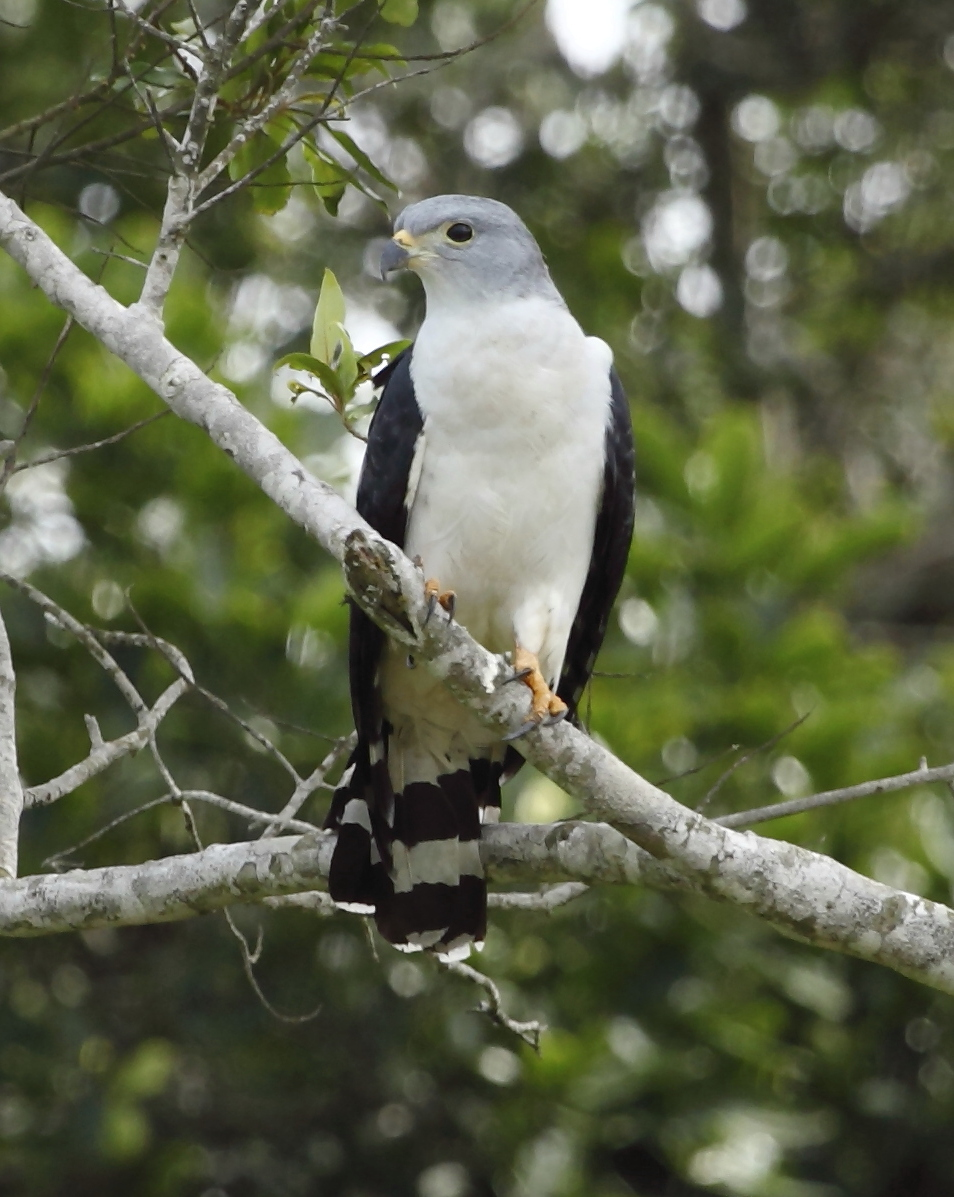
- Adult at Restinga de Bertioga State Park in São Paulo state, Brazil

Conservation status
- Least Concern (IUCN 3.1)

Scientific classification
- Kingdom: Animalia
- Phylum: Chordata
- Class: Aves
- Order: Accipitriformes
- Family: Accipitridae
- Genus: Leptodon
- Species: L. cayanensis

Binomial name
- Leptodon cayanensis (Latham, 1790)

Subspecies
- L. c. cayanensis - (Latham, 1790); L. c. monachus - (Vieillot, 1817)

= Gray-headed kite =

Species of bird

The gray-headed kite (Leptodon cayanensis) is a raptor found in open woodland and swamp forests. It shares the genus Leptodon with the extremely rare white-collared kite. It breeds from eastern Mexico and Trinidad south to Peru, Bolivia, Brazil and northern Argentina.

== Description ==
The gray-headed kite is 46–53 cm in length and weighs 410–605 grams (.9–1.3 lb)

The adult has a grey head, black upperparts, white underparts, and a black tail with two or three white bars. The bill is blue and the legs grey. The flight is a deliberate flap-flap-glide. Immature birds have three colour morphs; the light phase is similar to the adult, but has a white head and neck, with a black crown and eyestripe, black bill and yellow legs, closely resembling the Black-and-white hawk-eagle (Spizaetus melanoleucus). The rufous phase has a reddish neck with a white throat, black malar stripes and a black, long crest closely resembling the adult Ornate hawk-eagle (Spizaetus ornatus). The dark phase has a blackish head, neck and upper parts, and dark-streaked buff underparts closely resembling the Black hawk-eagle (Spizaetus tyrannus). The sophistication in the mimicry of these juveniles is remarkable and has only been described a few times.

== Ecology ==
The gray-headed kite feeds mainly on reptiles such as arboreal geckos, other lizards and snakes, but also takes frogs, molluscs and large insects (including larvae and combs of hornets, wasps and bees). It also feeds on eggs, young or injured birds. It usually sits on an open high perch from which it swoops on its prey. The call is a mewling keow. The nest is made of sticks lined with grass and is built high in a tree. The clutch is one or two white eggs, purplish at one end and spotted brown.
