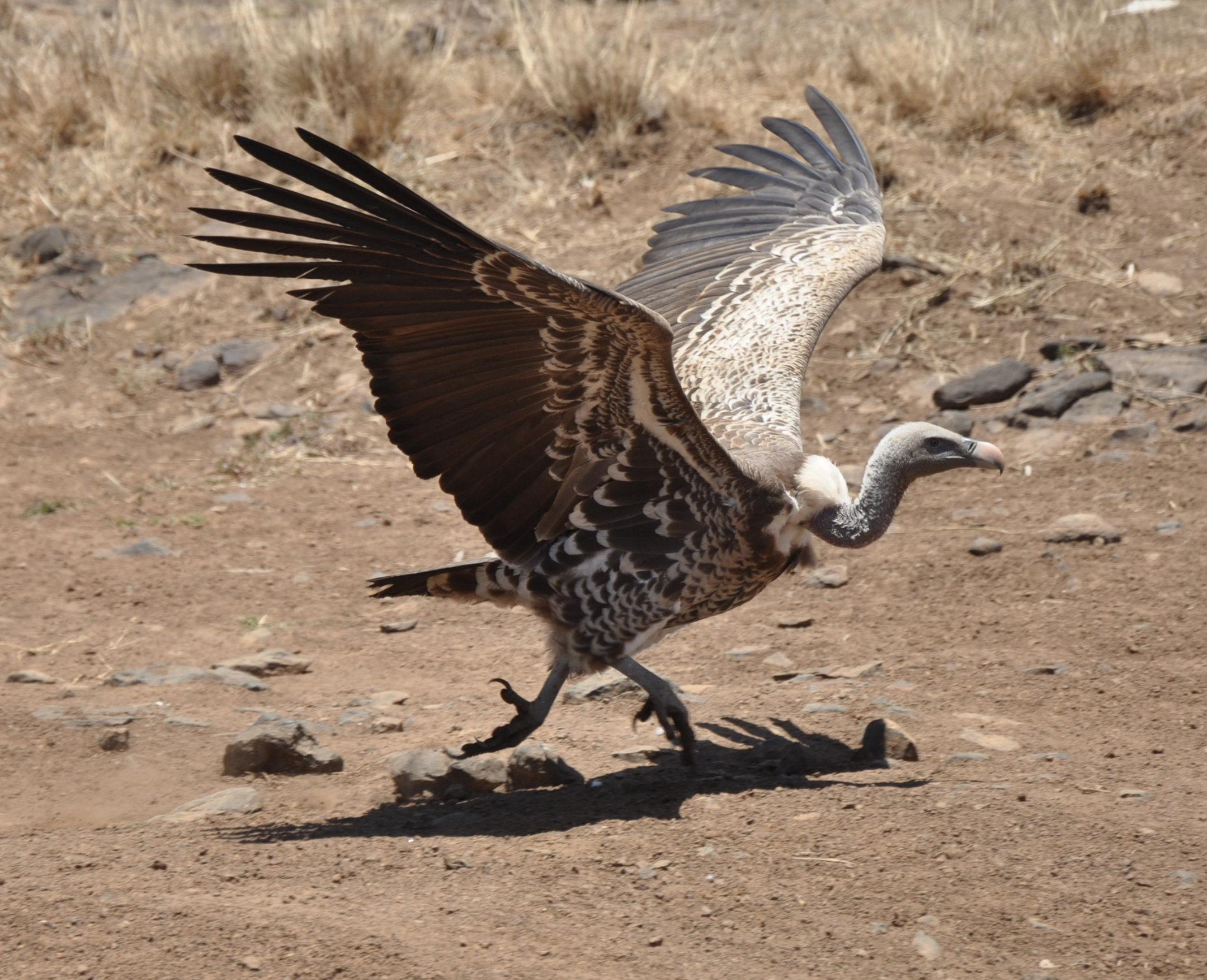
- Rüppell's vulture

Scientific classification
- Kingdom: Animalia
- Phylum: Chordata
- Class: Aves
- Clade: Telluraves
- Clade: Accipitrimorphae

Orders and families
- Accipitriformes; Accipitridae p.p.; Gypaetinae; Aegypiinae; Cathartiformes; Cathartidae

Cladistically included but traditionally excluded taxa
- Sagittariidae; Pandionidae; Accipitridae p.p.; Elaninae; Polyboroidinae; Perninae; Circaetinae; Aquilinae; Harpiinae; Lophospizinae; Accipitrinae; Harpaginae; Buteoninae

= Vulture =

Vulture Temporal range: Miocene – Recent

Common name for a type of bird

A vulture is a bird of prey that scavenges on carrion. There are 23 extant species of vulture (including condors). Old World vultures include 16 living species native to Europe, Africa, and Asia; New World vultures are native to North and South America and consist of seven species. A particular characteristic of many vultures is a bald, unfeathered head. This bare skin is thought to keep the head clean when feeding, and also plays an important role in thermoregulation.

Vultures have been observed to hunch their bodies and tuck in their heads in the cold, and open their wings and stretch their necks in the heat. They also urinate on themselves as a means of cooling their bodies.

A group of vultures in flight is called a "kettle", while the term "committee" refers to a group of vultures resting on the ground or in trees. A group of vultures that are feeding is termed a "wake".

== Taxonomy ==
Although New World vultures and Old World vultures share many resemblances, they are not very closely related. Rather, they share resemblance because of convergent evolution.

Early naturalists placed all vultures under one single biological group. Carl Linnaeus had assigned both Old World vultures and New World vultures in a Vultur genus, even including the harpy eagle. Soon anatomists split Old and New World vultures, with New World vultures being placed in a new suborder, Cathartae, later renamed Cathartidae as per the Rules of Nomenclature (from Greek: carthartes, meaning "purifier") by French ornithologist Frédéric de Lafresnaye. The suborder was later recognised as a family, rather than a suborder.

New World vultures were traditionally placed in a family of their own in the Falconiformes. However, in the late 20th century some ornithologists argued that they are more closely related to storks on the basis of karyotype. Thus some authorities placed them in the Ciconiiformes with storks and herons; Sibley and Monroe (1990) even considered them a subfamily of the storks. This was criticized and an early DNA sequence study was based on erroneous data and subsequently retracted.

== Old World ==
The Old World vultures found in Africa, Asia, and Europe belong to the family Accipitridae, which also includes eagles, kites, buzzards, and hawks. Old World vultures find carcasses primarily by sight.

The 16 species in 9 genera are:

- Cinereous vulture, Aegypius monachus
- Griffon vulture, Gyps fulvus
- White-rumped vulture, Gyps bengalensis
- Rüppell's vulture, Gyps rueppelli
- Indian vulture, Gyps indicus
- Slender-billed vulture, Gyps tenuirostris
- Himalayan vulture, Gyps himalayensis
- White-backed vulture, Gyps africanus
- Cape vulture, Gyps coprotheres
- Hooded vulture, Necrosyrtes monachus
- Red-headed vulture, Sarcogyps calvus
- Lappet-faced vulture, Torgos tracheliotos
- White-headed vulture, Trigonoceps occipitalis
- Bearded vulture (Lammergeier), Gypaetus barbatus
- Egyptian vulture, Neophron percnopterus
- Palm-nut vulture, Gypohierax angolensis
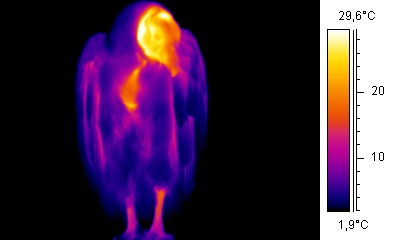
Some members of both the Old and New World vultures have an unfeathered neck and head, shown as radiating heat in this thermographic image.

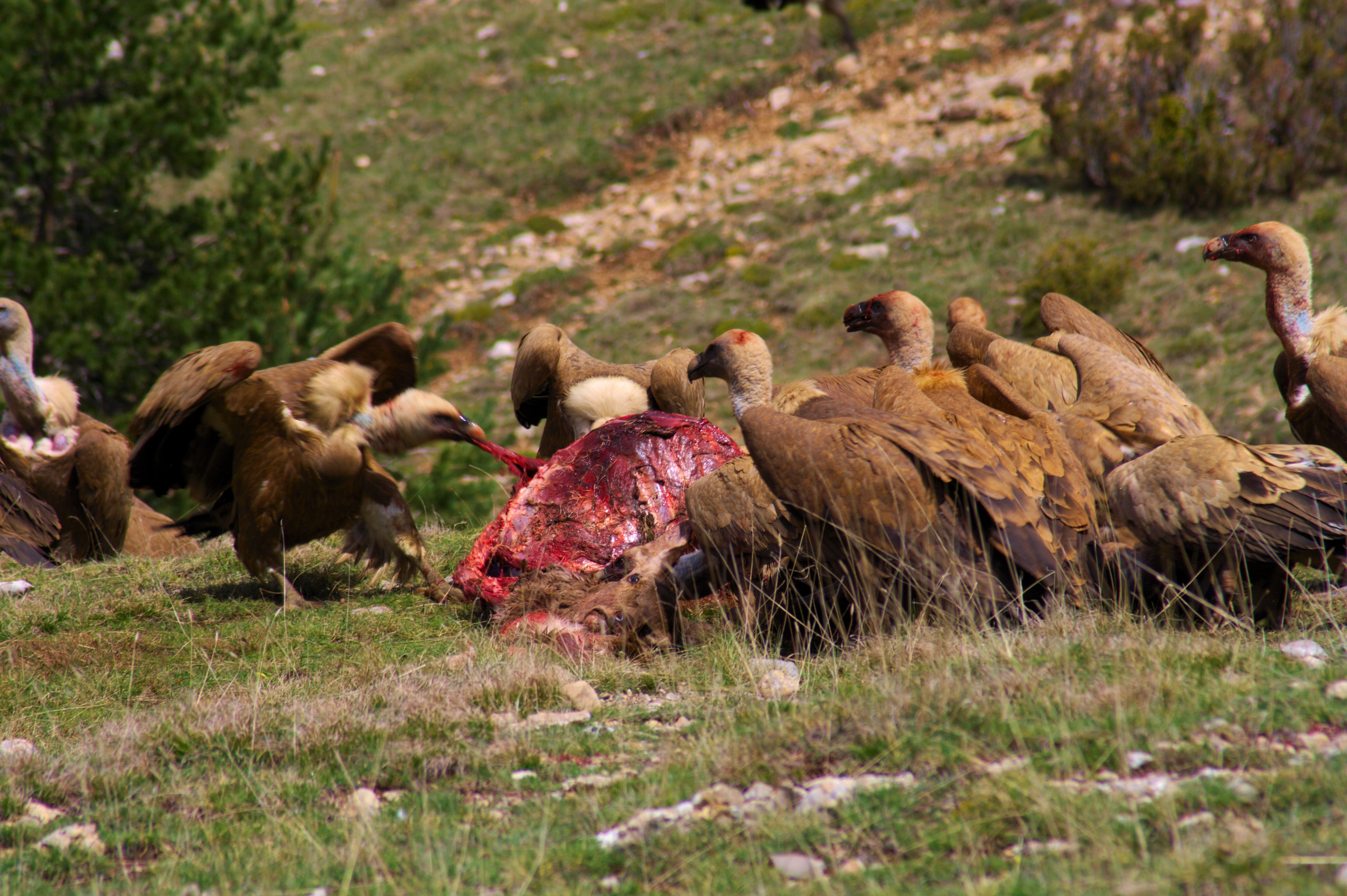
Griffon vultures scavenging a red deer carcass in Spain

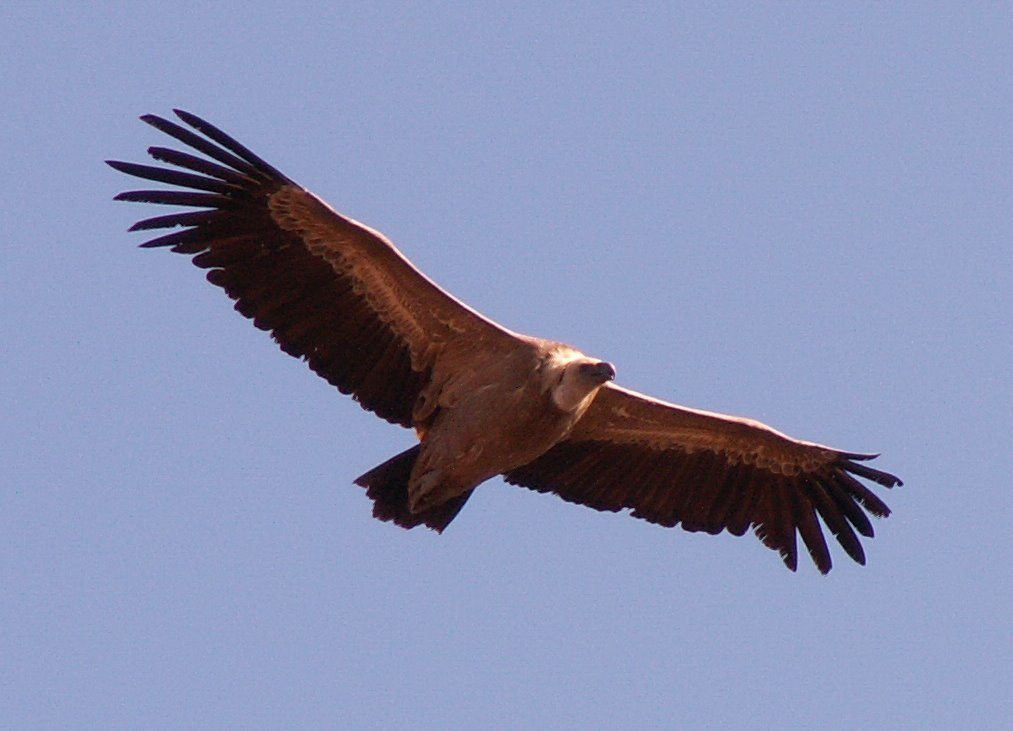
Griffon vulture soaring

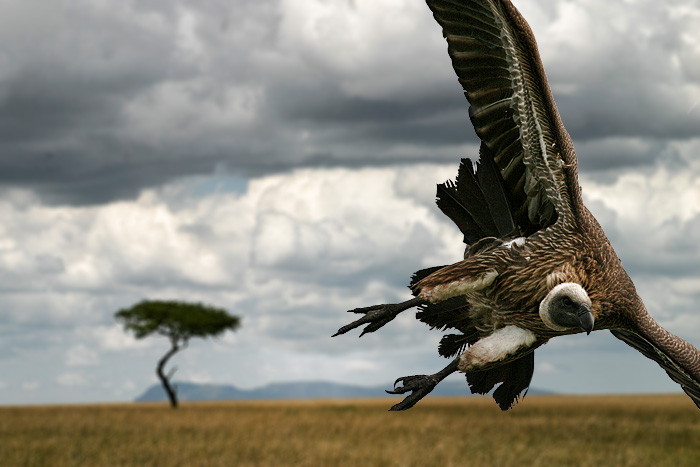
Vulture preparing to land in Kenya

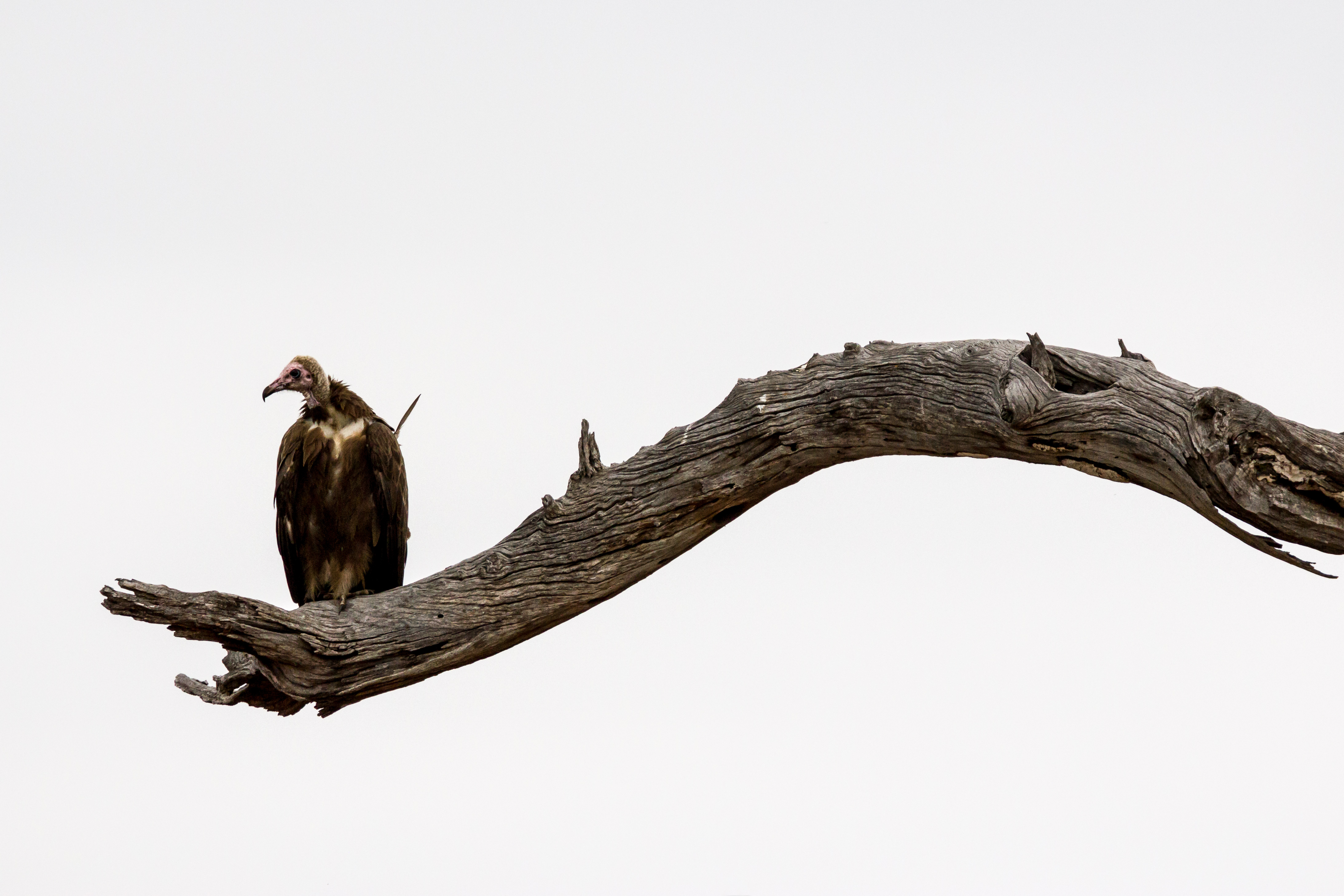
African hooded vulture in Kruger National Park

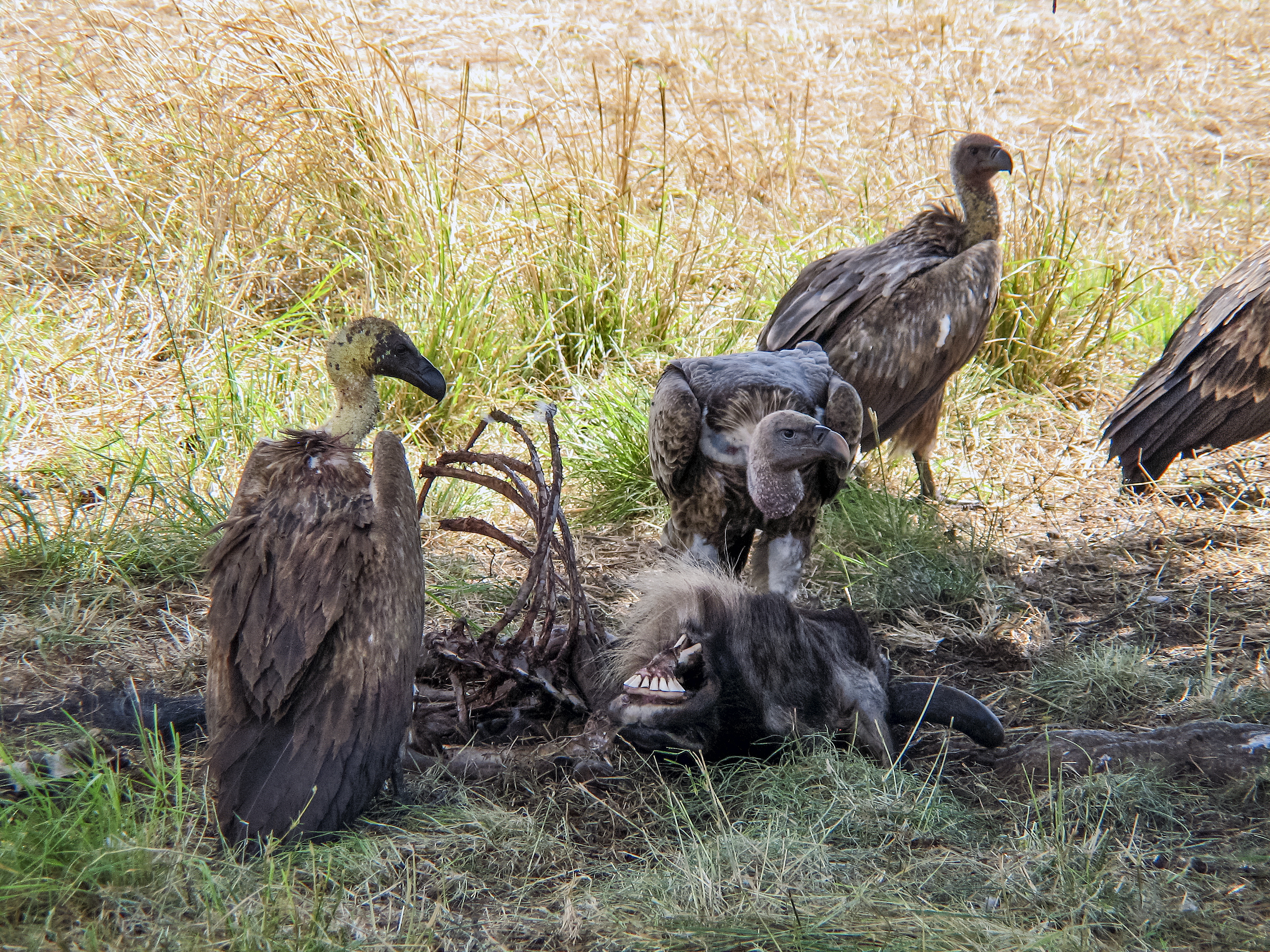
A wake of white-backed vultures eating a wildebeest carcass in Maasai Mara

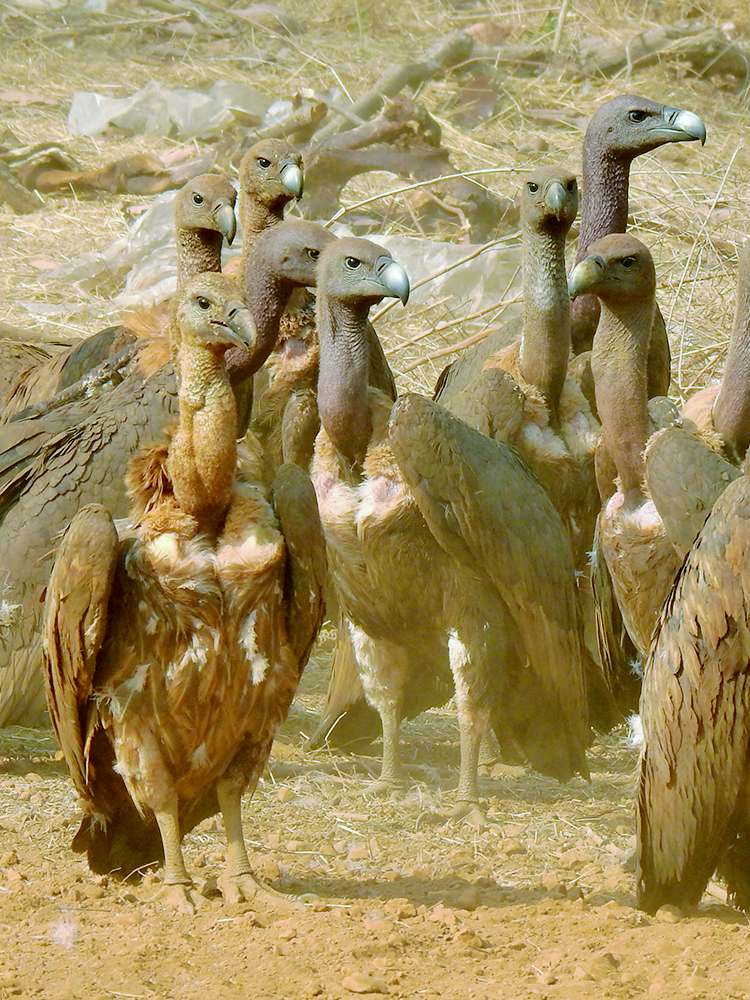
Flock of white-rumped vultures in India

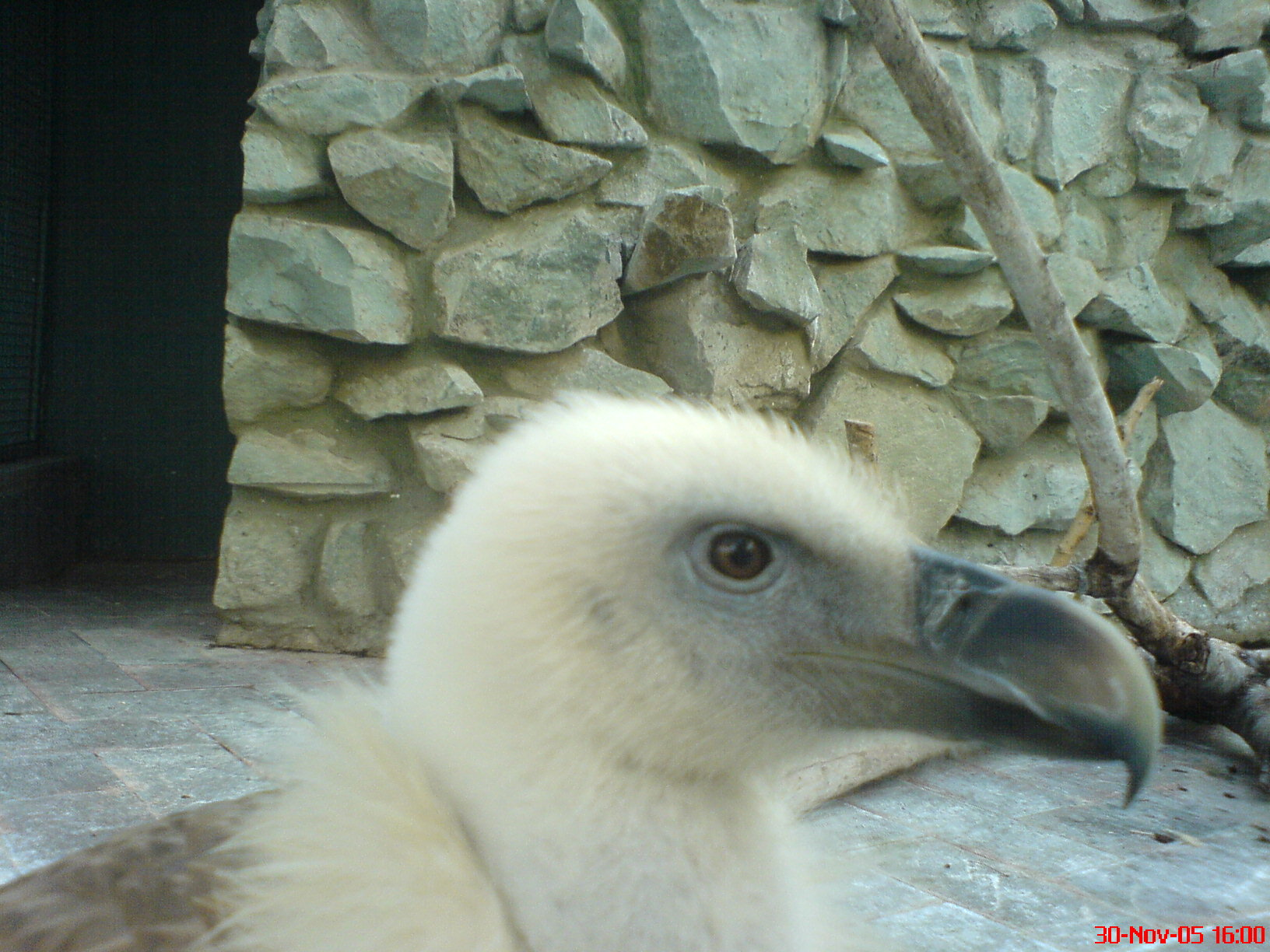
Head of a vulture chick, Iran

== New World ==
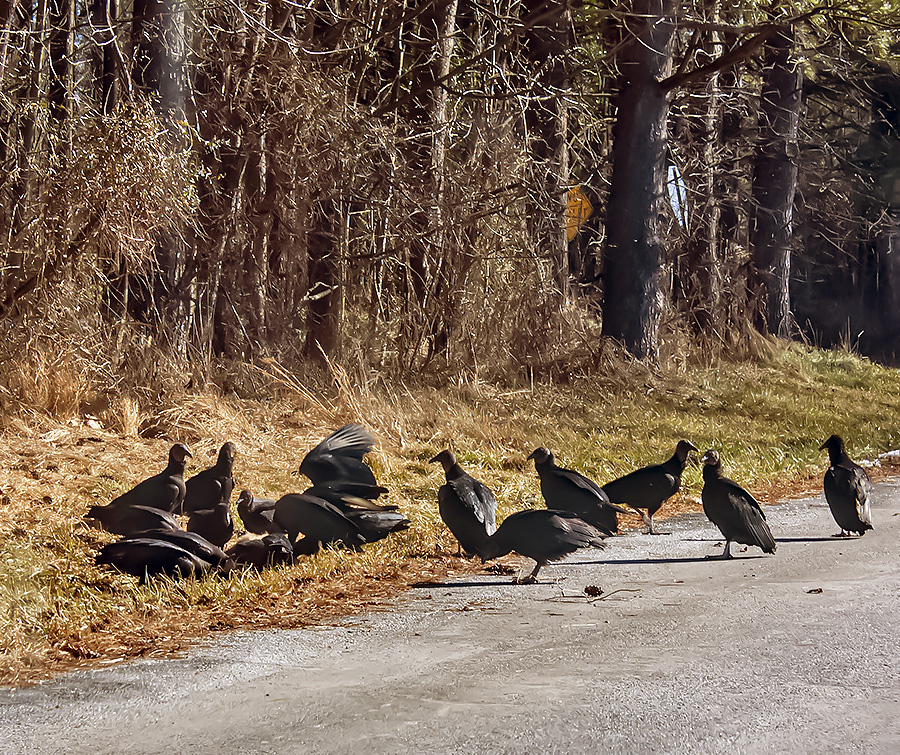
American black vultures congregated at roadkill

The New World vultures and condors found in warm and temperate areas of the Americas belong to the family Cathartidae. Several species have a good sense of smell, unusual for raptors, and are able to smell dead animals from great heights, up to a mile away. The seven species are:

- Black vulture Coragyps atratus in South America and north to the US
- Turkey vulture Cathartes aura throughout the Americas to southern Canada
- Lesser yellow-headed vulture Cathartes burrovianus in South America and north to Mexico
- Greater yellow-headed vulture Cathartes melambrotus in the Amazon Basin of tropical South America
- California condor Gymnogyps californianus in California, formerly widespread in the mountains of western North America
- Andean condor Vultur gryphus in the Andes
- King vulture Sarcoramphus papa from southern Mexico to northern Argentina

== Feeding ==
Vultures are carrion-eating scavengers, meaning that they feed on dead animals. Outside the oceans, vultures are the only vertebrates known to be obligate scavengers. They rarely attack healthy animals, but may kill the wounded or sick. When a carcass has too thick a hide for its beak to open, it waits for a larger scavenger to eat first. Vast numbers have been seen upon battlefields. They gorge themselves when prey is abundant, until their crops bulge, and sit, sleepy or half torpid, to digest their food. These birds do not carry food to their young in their talons but disgorge it from their crops. The mountain-dwelling bearded vulture is the only vertebrate to specialize in eating bones; it carries bones to the nest for the young, and hunts some live prey.

Vultures are of great value as scavengers, especially in hot regions. Vulture stomach acid is exceptionally corrosive (pH=1.0), allowing them to safely digest putrid carcasses infected with botulinum toxin, hog cholera virus, and anthrax bacteria that would be lethal to other scavengers. New World vultures often vomit when threatened or approached. Contrary to some accounts, they do not "projectile vomit" on their attacker in defense, but to lighten their stomach load to ease take-off. The vomited meal residue may distract a predator, allowing the bird to escape.

In Catalonia, the Egyptian vulture has been recorded as having waste and prey from landfills make up a notable part of its diet, and that vultures that consumed waste from landfills were less likely to feed on livestock.

Research from 2020 revealed that vultures responded to auditory cues of large mammalian prey being attacked and killed and the resulting noise from foraging by other animals such as hyenas, interpreting these cues as scavenging opportunities. Vultures also use the behavior of other avian scavengers as a visual foraging cue instead of relying only on being able to see a carcass.

New World vultures also urinate straight down their legs; the uric acid kills bacteria accumulated from walking through carcasses, and also acts as evaporative cooling.

== Conservation status ==
Vultures in south Asia, mainly in India and Nepal, have declined dramatically since the early 1990s. It has been found that this decline was caused by residues of the drug diclofenac in livestock carcasses. The government of India has taken very late cognizance of this fact and has banned the drug for animals. It may take decades for vultures to come back to their earlier population level, if ever. Without them to pick corpses clean, feral dogs have multiplied, feeding on the carrion, and age-old practices like the sky burials of the Parsees are coming to an end, permanently reducing the supply of corpses. The same problem is also seen in Nepal where the government has taken some late steps to conserve the remaining vultures.

The vulture population is threatened across Africa and Eurasia. There are many human activities that threaten vultures such as poisoning and collisions with wind turbines. In central Africa there have been efforts to conserve the remaining vultures and bring their population numbers back up. The decline is largely due to the trade in vulture meat, "it is estimated that more than 1×10^{9} kg [2.2×10^{9} lb] of wild animal meat is traded" and vultures take up a large percentage of this bushmeat due to the demand in the fetish market. The substantial drop in vulture populations in the continent of Africa is also said to be the result of both intentional and unintentional poisoning, with one study finding it to be the cause of 61% of the vulture deaths recorded.

A recent study in 2016, reported that "of the 22 vulture species, nine are critically endangered, three are endangered, four are near threatened, and six are least concern".

The conservation status of vultures is of particular concern to humans. For example, the decline of vulture populations can lead to increased disease transmission and resource damage, through increased populations of disease vector and pest animal populations that scavenge carcasses opportunistically. Vultures control these pests and disease vectors indirectly through competition for carcasses.

On 20 June 2019, the corpses of 468 white-backed vultures, 17 white-headed vultures, 28 hooded vultures, 14 lappet-faced vultures and 10 cape vultures, altogether 537 vultures, besides 2 tawny eagles, were found in northern Botswana. It is suspected that they died after eating the corpses of three elephants poisoned by poachers. The carcasses may have been poisoned to kill or deter vultures, since circling vultures can alert rangers to dead animals and help them locate evidence of poaching.

== In myth and culture ==
In Ancient Egyptian art, Nekhbet, a mythological goddess and patron of both the city of Nekheb and Upper Egypt was depicted as a vulture. Alan Gardiner identified the species that was used in divine iconography as a griffon vulture. Arielle P. Kozloff argues that the vultures in New Kingdom art, with their blue-tipped beaks and loose skin, better resemble the lappet-faced vulture. Many Great Royal Wives wore vulture crowns – a symbol of protection from the goddess Nekhbet.

Ancient Egyptians believed that all vultures were female and were spontaneously born from eggs without the intervention of a male, and therefore linked the birds to purity and motherhood, but also the eternal cycle of death and rebirth for their ability to transform the "death" they feed on – i.e. carrion and waste – into life.

In Pre-Columbian times, vultures were appreciated as extraordinary beings and had high iconographic status. They appear in many Mesoamerican myths, legends, and fables from civilizations such as the Maya and Aztecs, some depicting them negatively, others positively.

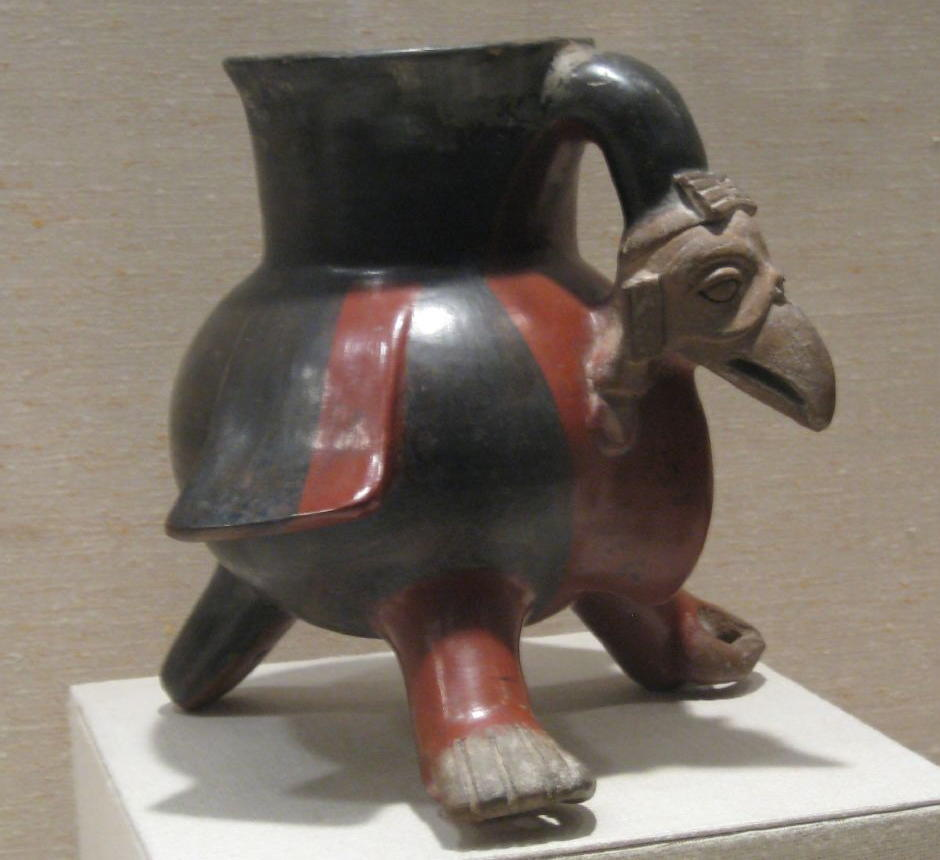
The Aztec vulture vessel at the new Pre-Columbian Mesoamerican Pottery Gallery

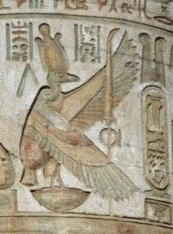
Nekhbet with staff and shen ring

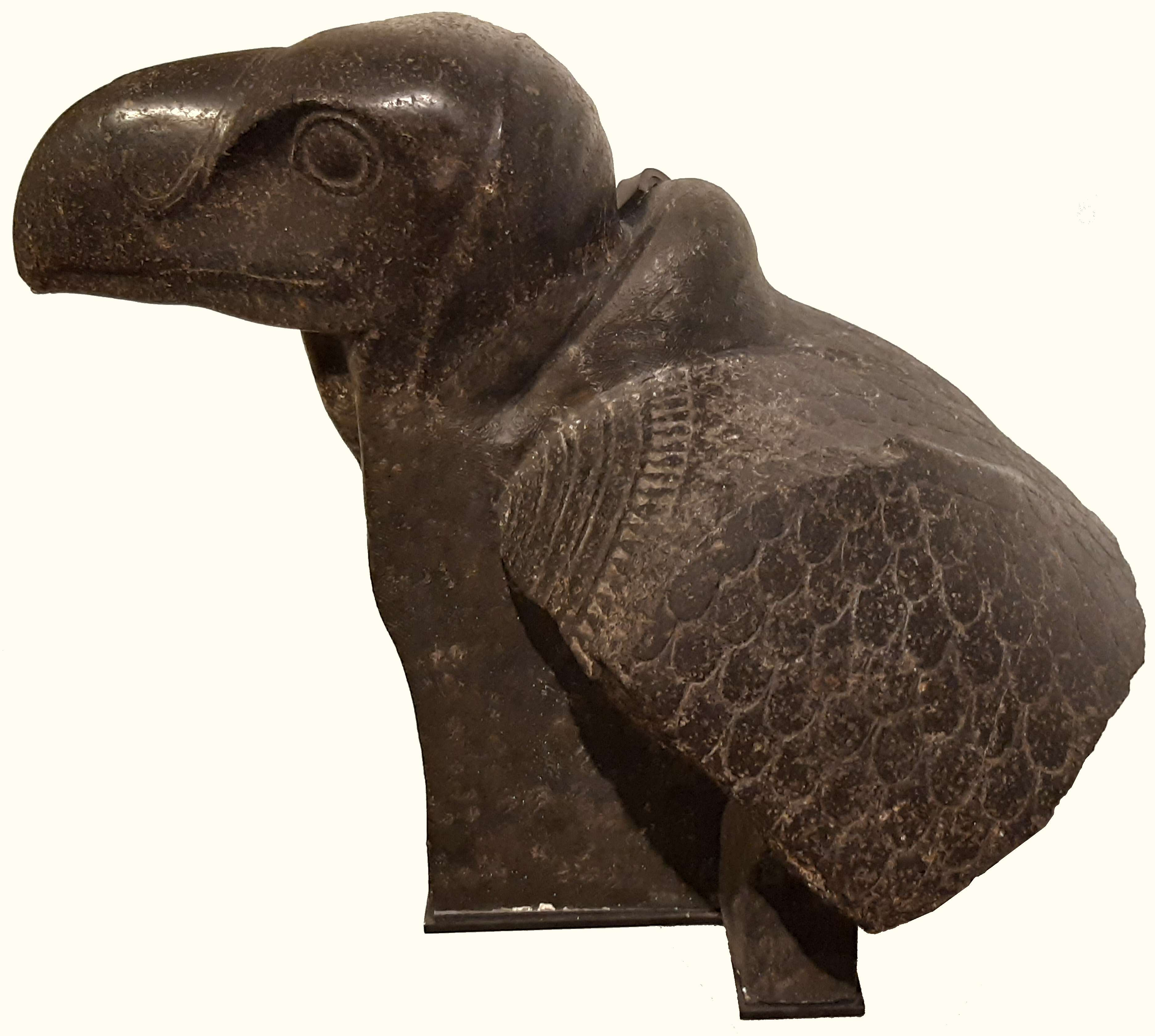
Granite vulture from Temple of Taharqa, Sanam Abu Dom, Napatan Period, 25th Dynasty

== See also ==
- Jatayu
- Stele of the Vultures
