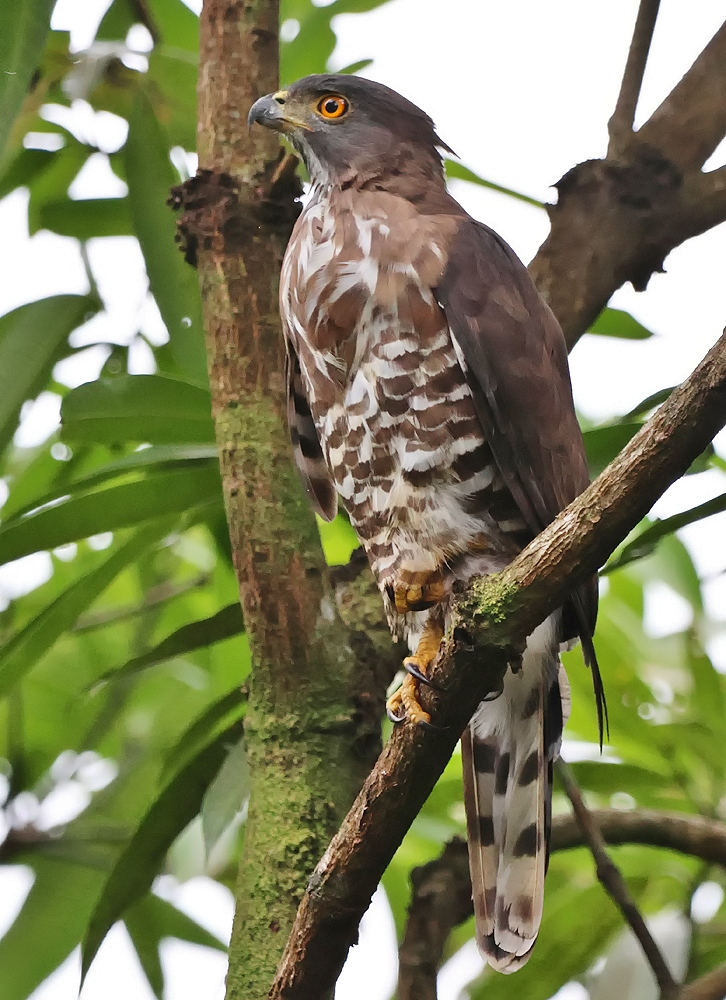
- Lophospiza trivirgata peninsulae; clicked in Kannur, Kerala.

Conservation status
- Least Concern (IUCN 3.1)

Scientific classification
- Kingdom: Animalia
- Phylum: Chordata
- Class: Aves
- Order: Accipitriformes
- Family: Accipitridae
- Genus: Lophospiza
- Species: L. trivirgata

Binomial name
- Lophospiza trivirgata (Temminck, 1824)
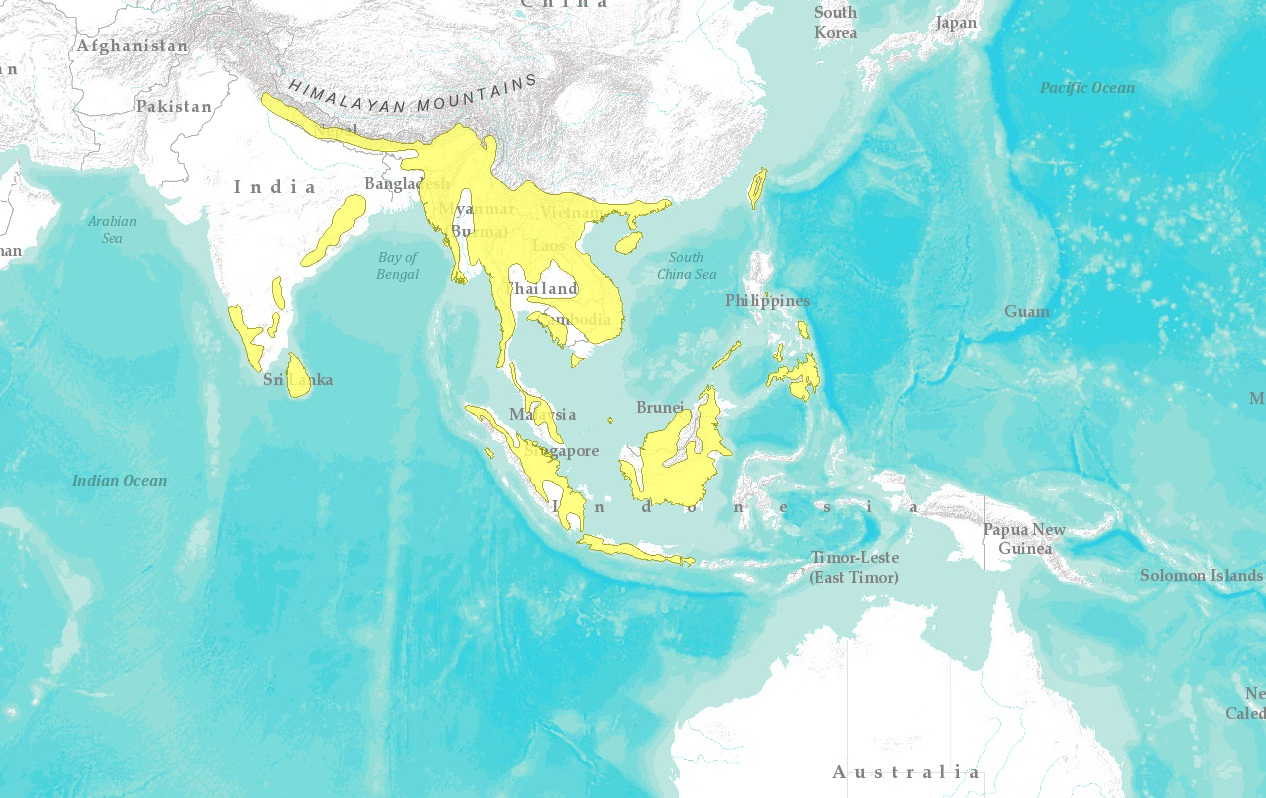
- Range map yellow: possible residence.

Synonyms
- Falco trivirgatus Temminck, 1982; Accipiter trivirgatus

= Crested goshawk =

Species of bird

The crested goshawk (Lophospiza trivirgata) is a bird of prey in the family Accipitridae that is widely distributed in tropical Asia. It was formerly placed in the genus Accipiter.

== Taxonomy ==
The crested goshawk was formally described in 1824 by the Dutch zoologist Coenraad Jacob Temminck under the binomial name Falco trivirgatus. It was formerly placed in the very large genus Accipiter. When molecular phylogenetic studies found that Accipiter was polyphyletic, the genus was split to create monophyletic genera. As part of this reorganisation, the genus Lophospiza which was erected in 1844 by the German naturalist Johann Jakob Kaup was resurrected to accommodate the crested goshawk and the closely related Sulawesi goshawk.

The specific epithet trivirgata combines the Latin tri meaning "three" with virgatus meaning "striped".

Eleven subspecies are recognised:

- L. t. indica (Hodgson, 1836) – northeast India to south China, Indochina and the Malay Peninsula
- L. t. formosae (Mayr, 1949) – Taiwan
- L. t. peninsulae (Koelz, 1949) – southwest India
- L. t. layardi (Whistler, 1936) – Sri Lanka
- L. t. trivirgata (Temminck, 1824) – Sumatra
- L. t. niasensis (Mayr, 1949) – Nias (west of north Sumatra)
- L. t. javanica (Mayr, 1949) – Java and Bali
- L. t. microsticta (Mayr, 1949) – Borneo
- L. t. palawana (Mayr, 1949) – Palawan group (southwest Philippines)
- L. t. castroi (Manuel & Gilliard, 1952) – Polillo (north Philippines)
- L. t. extima (Mayr, 1945) – southeast Philippines

== Description ==
This raptor has short broad wings and a long tail, both adaptations to manoeuvring through trees. It is 30–46 cm in length, with the female much larger than the male. The larger size and a short crest, clearly visible in profile, are the best distinctions from its relative, the besra (Tachyspiza virgata).

The male has a dark brown crown, grey head sides and black moustachial and throat stripes. The pale underparts are patterned with rufous streaks on the breast and bars on the belly. The larger female has a browner head and brown underpart streaks and bars. The juvenile has pale fringes to its head feathers, and the underpart background colour is buff rather than white.

The flight is a characteristic "slow flap, slow flap, straight glide", similar to other Accipiter species such as the Eurasian goshawk (Astur gentilis).

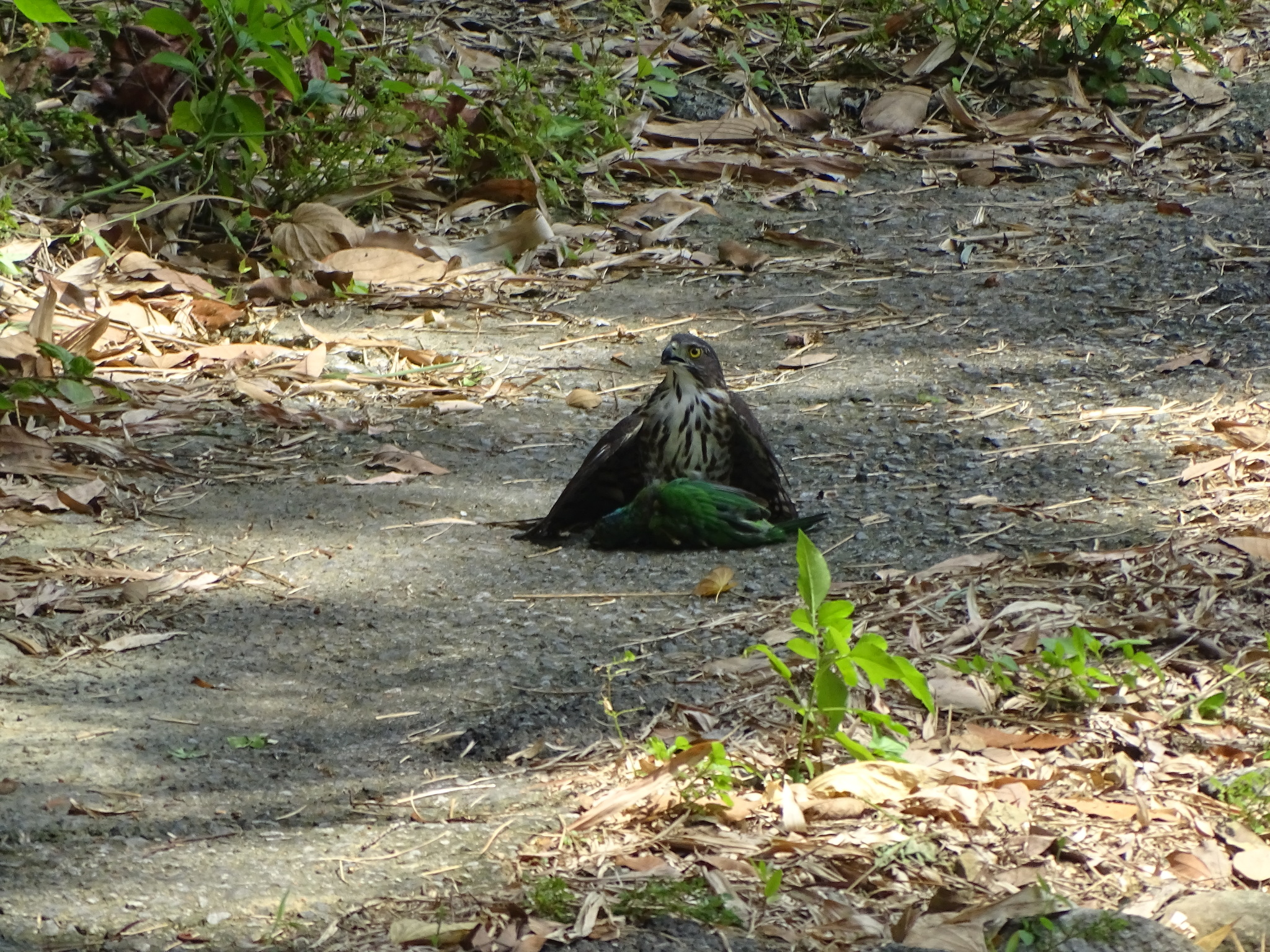
L. t. formosae eating a Taiwan barbet

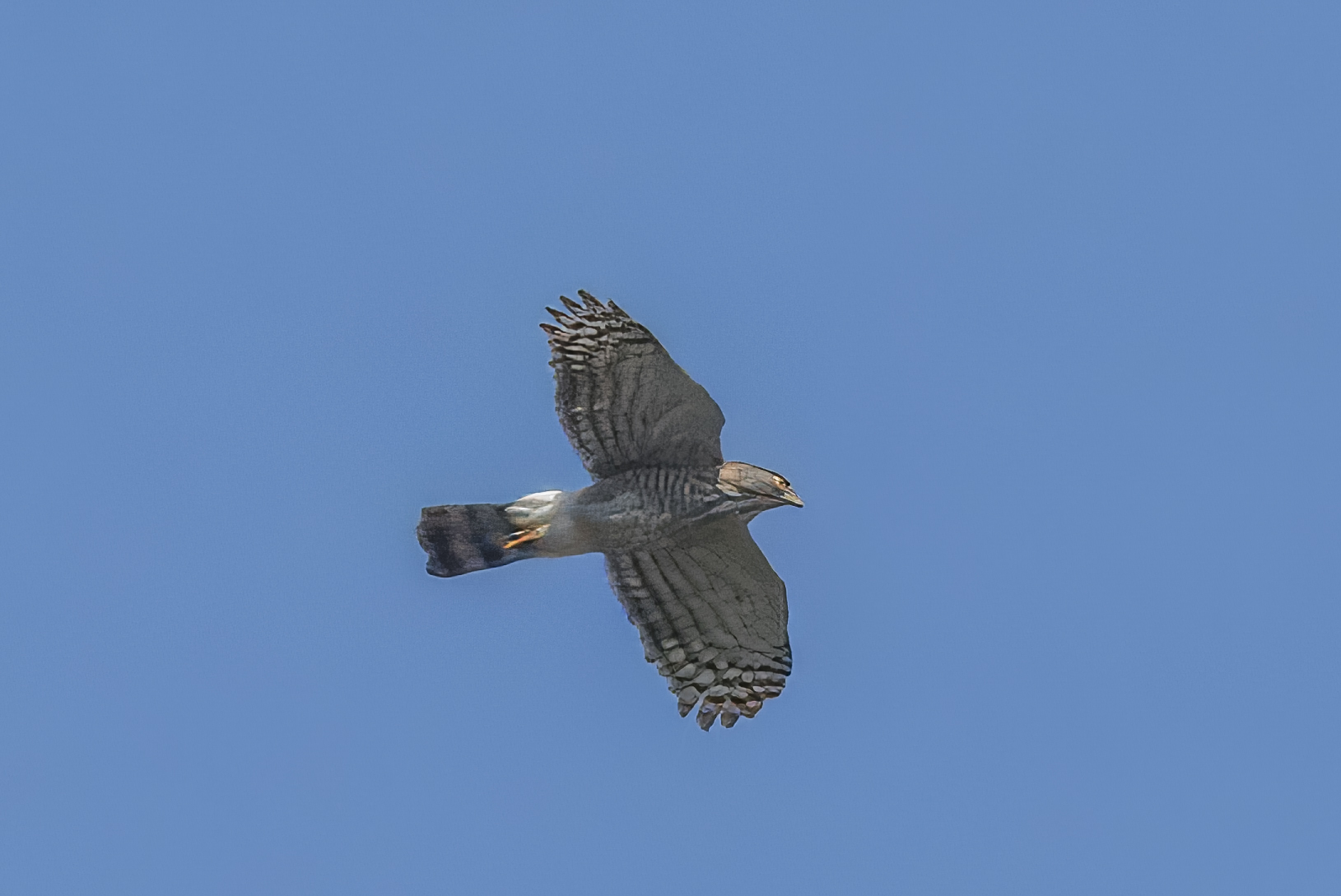
L. t. formosae, Taiwan

== Range and ecology ==
The crested goshawk breeds in southern Asia, from India and Sri Lanka to southern China, Indonesia, Taiwan, and the Philippines. It is primarily a lowland bird, and an all-year resident. Even in upland habitat it is resident in winter, for example in the Himalayas foothills of Bhutan or in Sal (Shorea robusta) forest in India's Dehradun district. In these lands at the northern end of its range, it is generally very rare however. Essentially it is limited to tropical and warm subtropical areas. In Malaysia and Singapore there is increasing evidence of this species adapting to life in urban centres.

Like its relatives, this secretive forest bird hunts birds, mammals and reptiles in woodland, relying on surprise as it flies from a perch to catch its prey unaware. It builds a stick nest in a tree and lays two or three eggs.

The ischnoceran louse Degeeriella storeri is a parasite of this bird; it is not yet known from any other host species. On the other hand, Kurodaia fulvofasciata, an amblyceran louse parasitizing the crested goshawk, is widely found on birds of prey throughout the Holarctic.

In Hong Kong, A. trivirgatus is a protected species under Wild Animals Protection Ordinance Cap 170. It can be found in Kam Shan Country Park.
