= Pengana =

Pengana Temporal range: Late Oligocene

Scientific classification
- Kingdom: Animalia
- Phylum: Chordata
- Class: Aves
- Order: Accipitriformes
- Family: Accipitridae
- Genus: †Pengana
- Species: †P. robertbolesi

Binomial name
- †Pengana robertbolesi Boles, 1993

Extinct genus of birds

Pengana, also referred to as flexiraptor, is an extinct bird of prey that lived during the late Oligocene in what is now Queensland, Australia. It is known only from a fragment of the tibiotarsus that was collected from the Riversleigh World Heritage Area. The tibiotarsus is unusual in that it allowed for the leg to be swivelled backwards and sideways, making it well adapted to reaching into holes and crevices and extracting prey. The genus is only known from a single species, Pengana robertbolesi.

== History and naming ==
The first known fossils of Pengana were collected from the Sticky Beak site at the Riversleigh World Heritage Area, northwestern Queensland. The holotype specimen, catalogued as QM F16865, is the distal end of the left tibiotarsus. A fragment of a femur from the White Hunter site might be referable to the genus on the grounds of its size, age and uniqueness compared to other Australian accipitrids. The Sticky Beak and White Hunter sites are both interpreted as being late Oligocene in age, which would make Pengana one of the oldest known accipitrid from Australia.

In 1993, Walter E. Boles described Pengana robertbolesi as a new genus and species of accipitrid on the basis of the tibiotarsus. The generic name, Pengana, is stated to have been derived from an Aboriginal word for 'hawk', although no particular language was specified. The specific name, robertbolesi, is in honour of the author's father, Richard Boles.

== Description ==
The only remains that can be confidently assigned to Pengana is the distal end of a tibiotarsus. The piece of bone is roughly rectangular in appearance and is overall flat. It shares a lot of similarities with the extant Harrier-hawks and Crane hawk. The supratendinal bridge, which is positioned just above the condyles, is almost horizontal, angled at 30°. Both the internal and external condyles are flattened mediolaterally (side-to-side) and run parallel to the proximodistal midline of the shaft. The shaft of the tibiotarsus is compressed from the front to the back. It, however, differs from the Harrier-hawks and Crane hawk in a number of ways. For instance, both the supratendinal canal and anterior intercondylar fossa have a greater proportional width. The distal opening to the supratendinal canal is situated above the internal condyle rather than at the lateral edge of it. In addition, tibiotarsus itself is twice as large as those of the modern taxa.

Boles (1993) stated Pengana to be larger than any living species of Australian bird of prey, with the notable exception of wedge-tailed eagle and white-bellied sea eagle.

== Classification ==
Due to the lack of material, the exact position of Pengana within Acciptiridae is currently unknown. Boles (1993) dismissed the idea of a close relationship with Harrier-hawks and Crane hawks, noting that similarities between the three taxa were limited only to the intertarsal joint. This would suggest that a double-jointed ankle had at evolved independently at least three times within Acciptridae. Regardless, Pengana, and the similarly aged Archaehierax, demonstrate that there was at least two different clades of accipitrids present in Australia close to the Oligocene-Miocene boundary.

== Paleobiology ==
Features of the intertarsal joint (i.e. a more horizontal supratendinal bridge and flattened distal condyles) suggests a greater degree of flexion backwards and sideways than in most accipitrids. A comparable leg-structure can be found in Crane hawks and Harrier-hawks, which allows them to easily reach into holes and crevices in search of prey. Based on the leg proportions of the two aforementioned hawks, Pengana might have had a total hindlimb length of 585-630 mm (23–25 in). With its long legs, it may have been able to probe into hollows that were at least 400 mm (15.7 in) deep. Its larger size compared to the two hawks meant that it could have hunted larger prey, specifically in the 250-300 g (0.6-0.7 lbs) range.

During the late Oligocene, the Riversleigh World Heritage Area would have been predominantly covered in temperate open forest or woodland. Plant fossils from the late Oligocene or early Miocene-aged Dunsinane site indicate the presence of deciduous vine thickets and sclerophyllous vegetation. However, undoubted rainforest plant taxa, such as Pleiogynium wannanii, are known from the same site, which suggests that patches of rainforest would have also been present, specifically around pools or along watercourses. Australia's climate at the time was cool and dry, before shifting to a more warm and wet climate during the early Miocene.
