= Aviraptor =

Aviraptor Temporal range: Oligocene, 31–30 Ma

Scientific classification
- Kingdom: Animalia
- Phylum: Chordata
- Class: Aves
- Order: Accipitriformes
- Family: Accipitridae
- Genus: †Aviraptor; Mayr & Hurum, 2020

Type species
- †Aviraptor longicrus Mayr & Hurum, 2020

Small extinct bird of prey

Aviraptor is an extinct genus of small accipitrid bird of prey known from the Oligocene of Poland. It contains one species, Aviraptor longicrus. It was named in 2020 by Gerald Mayr and Jørn Hurum based on a single nearly complete specimen. The genus name is derived from the Latin words avis meaning “bird” and raptor meaning “thief” and the species name is derived from the Latin words longus meaning “long” and crus meaning “leg”.

Aviraptor closely resembles modern hawks of the genus Accipiter in overall size and proportions. Like some species of Accipiter, it had long and slender legs. Aviraptor was very small for a bird of prey, with a body size similar to the modern tiny hawk Accipiter superciliosus and little sparrowhawk A. minullus. The bill of Aviraptor was not as sharply hooked as in most modern accipitrids, but is similar in shape to the modern harrier-hawks of the genus Polyboroides.

The size and proportions of Aviraptor are most similar to those of species that hunt other birds. It was a contemporary of some of the earliest species of passerine and hummingbird, which may have been its prey. The coexistence of some of the earliest passerines and hummingbirds with the earliest known bird-hunting raptor may indicate that Aviraptor evolved in response to the diversification of potential prey species.

Despite the overall similarity between Aviraptor and Accipiter, the two genera do not appear to be closely related: Aviraptor lived approximately 30–31 million years ago, whereas accipitrines are estimated to have evolved approximately 16–18 million years ago. Furthermore, Aviraptor differs from Accipiter in anatomical details such as the proportions of its second toe and the shape of the deltopectoral crest of the humerus.
