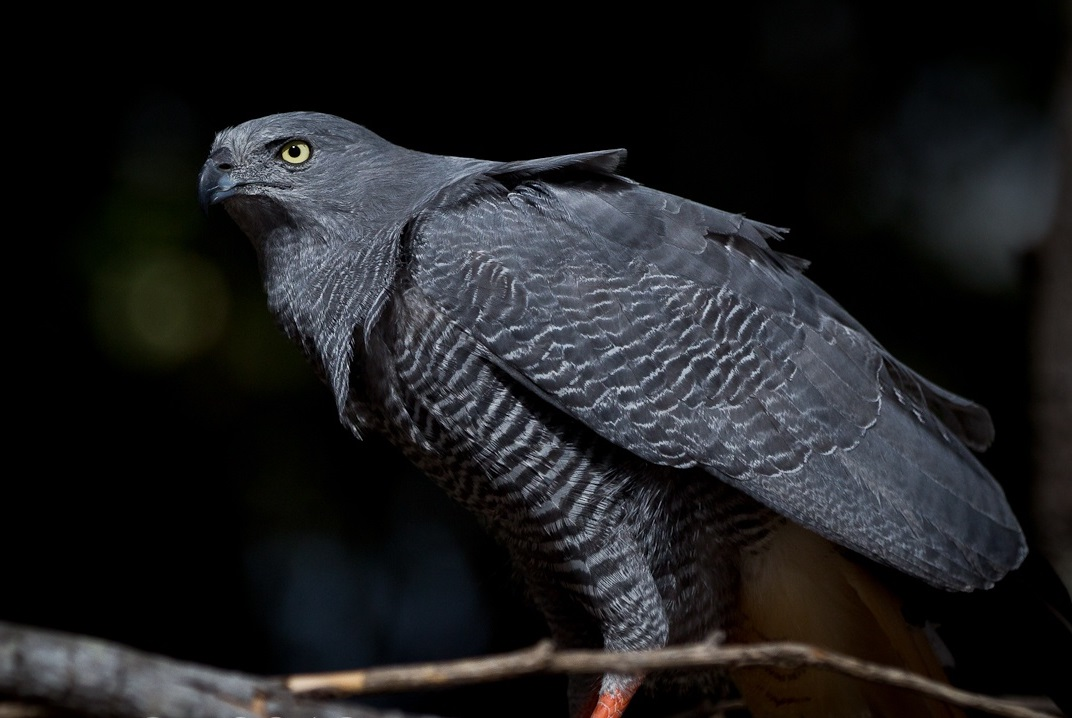
- Geranospiza caerulescens gracilis, Northeast Brazil

Conservation status
- Least Concern (IUCN 3.1)

Scientific classification
- Kingdom: Animalia
- Phylum: Chordata
- Class: Aves
- Order: Accipitriformes
- Family: Accipitridae
- Subfamily: Buteoninae
- Genus: Geranospiza; Kaup, 1847
- Species: G. caerulescens

Binomial name
- Geranospiza caerulescens (Vieillot, 1817)

= Crane hawk =

Species of bird

The crane hawk (Geranospiza caerulescens) is a species of bird of prey in the family Accipitridae. It is the only species placed in the genus Geranospiza.

== Taxonomy ==
The crane hawk used to be many species that were recently lumped into one. Those species are now designated as subspecies. Color varies clinally, though, and it is now commonly accepted that they comprise one species. There are also two species of harrier-hawks in Africa of the genus Polyboroides that, while they are morphologically and behaviorally similar, are not very closely related. They serve as a good example of convergent evolution.

Six subspecies are recognised:

- Geranospiza caerulescens livens Bangs & Penard, TE, 1921 – northwest Mexico
- Geranospiza caerulescens nigra (Du Bus de Gisignies, 1847) – Mexico to central Panama
- Geranospiza caerulescens balzarensis Sclater, WL, 1918 – east Panama to northwest Peru
- Geranospiza caerulescens caerulescens (Vieillot, 1817) – east Colombia to the Guianas to east Peru and Amazonian Brazil
- Geranospiza caerulescens gracilis (Temminck, 1821) – northeast Brazil
- Geranospiza caerulescens flexipes Peters, JL, 1935 – south Brazil to Paraguay, Bolivia, north Argentina and Uruguay
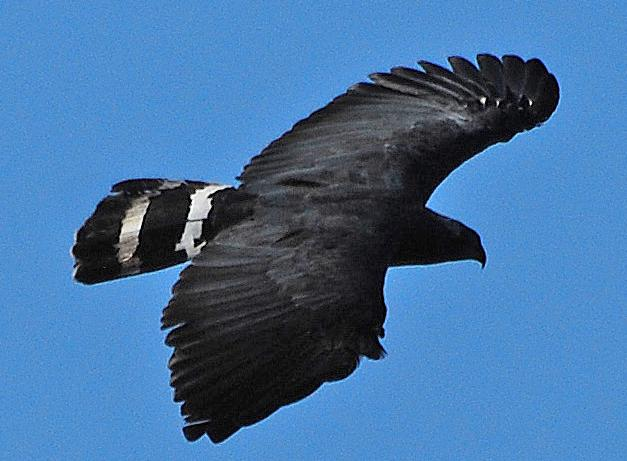
G. c. nigra, Mexico

G. c. flexipes, Pantanal, Brazil

== Habitat and distribution ==
Crane hawks occur in tropical lowlands at the edge of forests and are almost always closely associated with water. It is found in Argentina, Belize, Bolivia, Brazil, Colombia, Costa Rica, Ecuador, El Salvador, French Guiana, Guatemala, Guyana, Honduras, Mexico, Nicaragua, Panama, Paraguay, Peru, Suriname, Trinidad, Uruguay, and Venezuela. They are an irruptive and local migrant, probably moving in response to changing water conditions.

== Behavior ==
These hawks often forage by scanning from a perch or on the wing and swooping down to grab prey. However, they are notable for having "double-jointed" tarsal bones, allowing them to reach into tree cavities and extract prey, a trait they share with the genus of African harrier-hawks Polyboroides. Their main prey are small vertebrates, especially rodents, bats, lizards, snakes, frogs and small birds (especially nestlings of parrots and woodpeckers), but they have also been known to eat larger insects (such as beetles, cicadas and cockroaches), spiders, other arthropods and snails.

During breeding, nests are built in tree canopies, often in clumps of orchids or other epiphytes. The nest is a shallow cup of twigs, anywhere from 10–25 metres up in a tree. Clutches are usually 1-2 white-or-bluish-tinged eggs.

== Conservation ==
Nowhere is the crane hawk particularly common, but it is still widely distributed. However, it is considered threatened in Mexico, endangered in El Salvador, and at low risk in Argentina.
