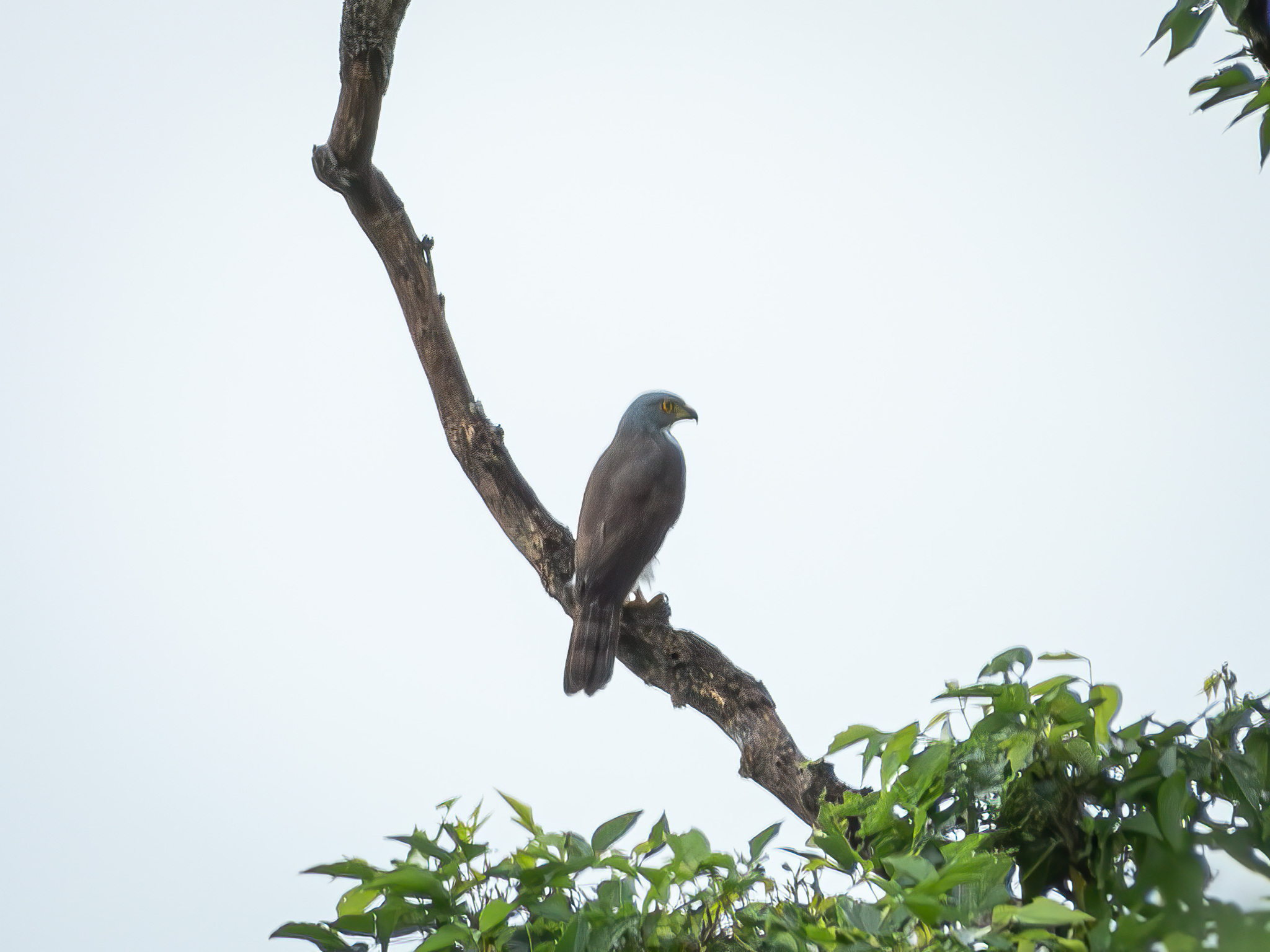

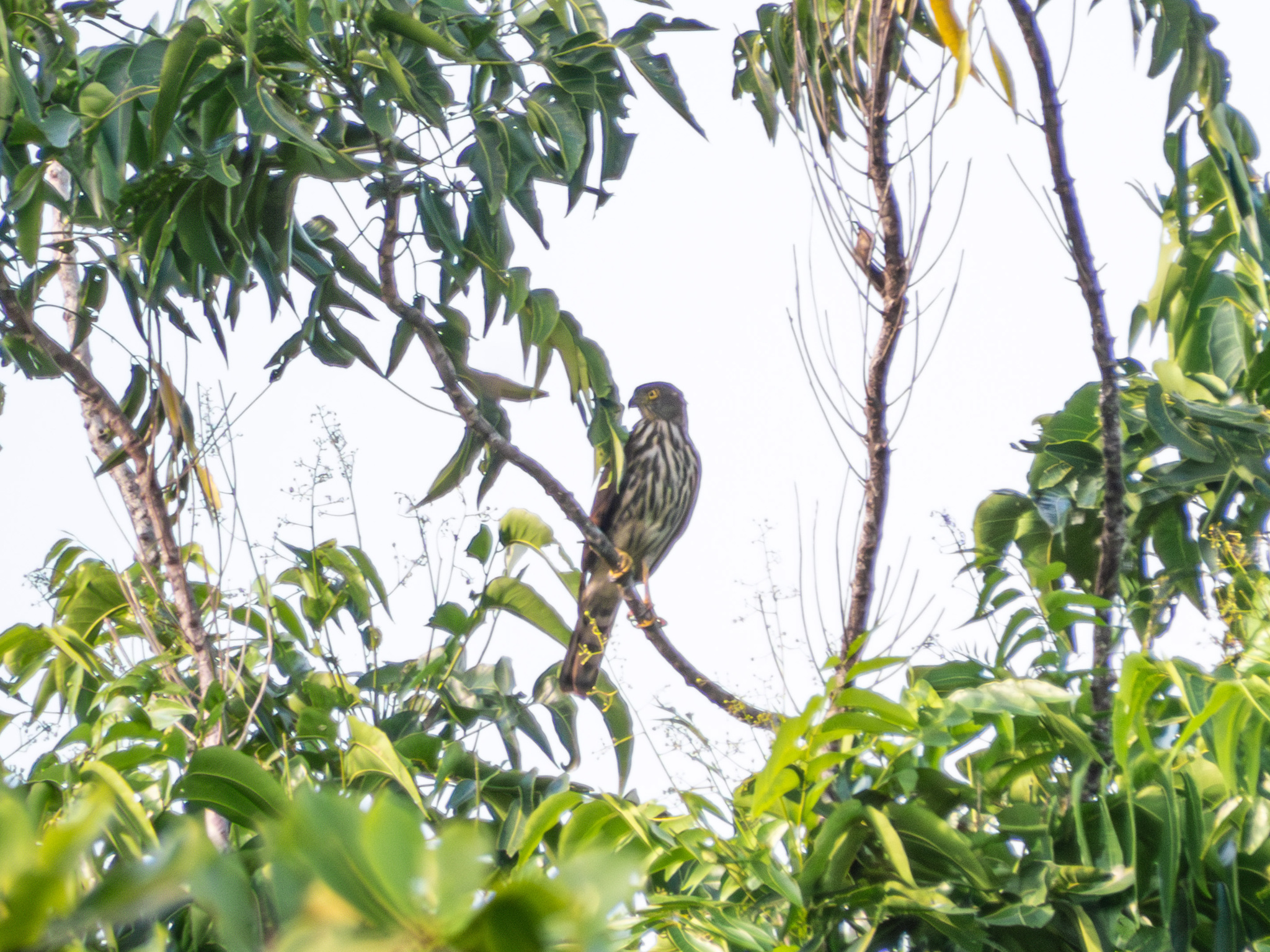

Conservation status
- Least Concern (IUCN 3.1)

Scientific classification
- Kingdom: Animalia
- Phylum: Chordata
- Class: Aves
- Order: Accipitriformes
- Family: Accipitridae
- Genus: Lophospiza
- Species: L. griseiceps

Binomial name
- Lophospiza griseiceps (Kaup, 1848)
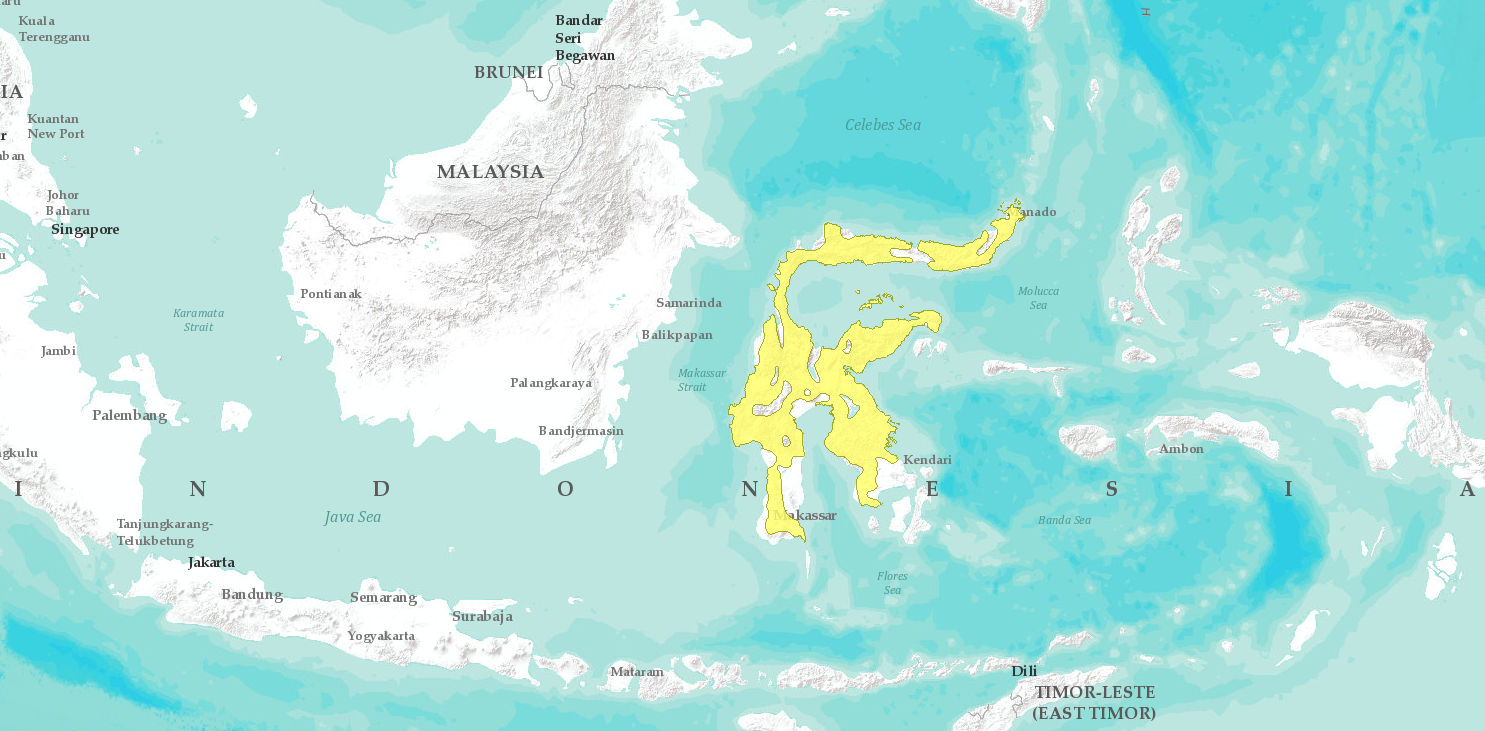
- Range map Southeastern

= Sulawesi goshawk =

Species of bird

Sulawesi Goshawk

The Sulawesi goshawk (Lophospiza griseiceps) is a species of bird of prey in the family Accipitridae. It is endemic to Sulawesi, Indonesia. Its natural habitats are subtropical or tropical moist lowland forest and subtropical or tropical moist montane forest. This species was formerly placed in the genus Accipiter.
