= Milvoides =

Milvoides Temporal range: Lutetian

Scientific classification
- Kingdom: Animalia
- Phylum: Chordata
- Class: Aves
- Order: Accipitriformes
- Family: Accipitridae
- Genus: †Milvoides
- Species: †M. kempi

Binomial name
- †Milvoides kempi Harrison & Walker, 1979

Extinct genus of birds

Milvoides is an extinct genus of accipitrid that lived during the Lutetian stage of the Eocene epoch.

== Distribution ==
Milvoides kempi is known from the Selsey Formation of England.
