= Palaeohierax =

Palaeohierax Temporal range: Late Oligocene

Scientific classification
- Kingdom: Animalia
- Phylum: Chordata
- Class: Aves
- Order: Accipitriformes
- Family: Accipitridae
- Genus: †Palaeohierax; Milne-Edwards, 1871
- Species: †P. gervaisii

Binomial name
- †Palaeohierax gervaisii Milne-Edwards, 1863

Extinct genus of birds

Palaeohierax is an extinct genus of Accipitridae birds from the late Oligocene. One species has been described, Palaeohierax gervaisii.
