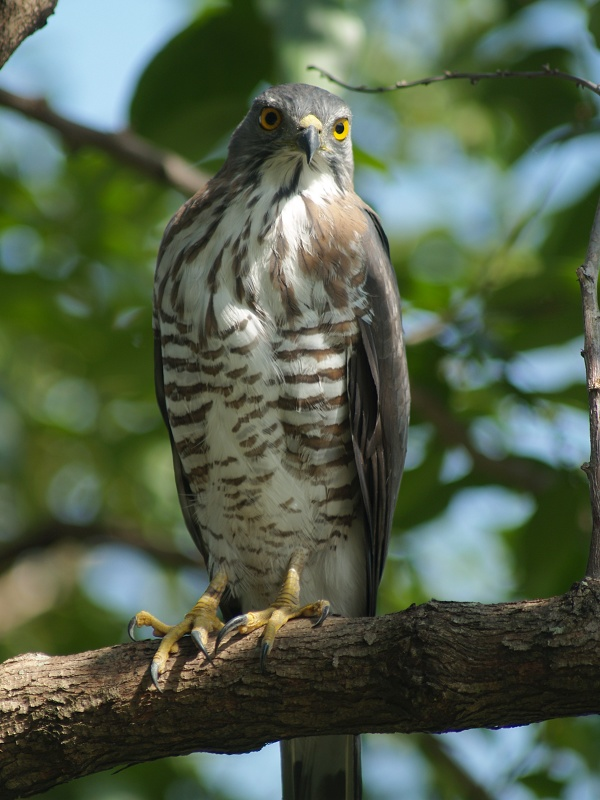
- Crested goshawk (Lophospiza trivirgatus)

Scientific classification
- Kingdom: Animalia
- Phylum: Chordata
- Class: Aves
- Order: Accipitriformes
- Family: Accipitridae
- Subfamily: Lophospizinae; Catanach et al 2024
- Genus: Lophospiza; Kaup, 1844

= Lophospiza =

Genus of birds

Lophospiza is a genus of Asian birds of prey in the family Accipitridae. It is the only genus in the subfamily Lophospizinae. The two species placed in this genus were formerly placed in the genus Accipiter.

== Taxonomy ==
The genus Lophospiza was introduced in 1844 by the German naturalist Johann Jakob Kaup with Falco trivirgatus Temminck as the type species. The name combines the Ancient Greek λοφος (lophos) meaning "crest" and σπιζιας (spizias) meaning "hawk".

The genus contains two species:

- Crested goshawk, Lophospiza trivirgata
- Sulawesi goshawk, Lophospiza griseiceps

Both species were formerly classified in the genus Accipiter but molecular phylogenetic studies found that Accipiter was polyphyletic. In the rearrangement to create monophyletic genera these two species were moved to the resurrected genus Lophospiza.
