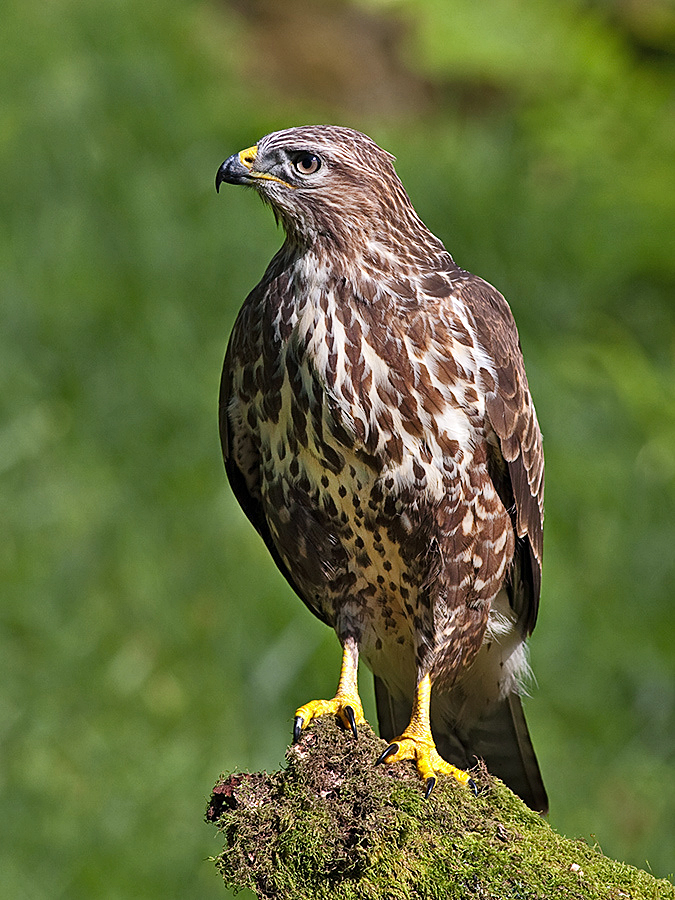
- Common buzzard (Buteo buteo)

Scientific classification
- Kingdom: Animalia
- Phylum: Chordata
- Class: Aves
- Order: Accipitriformes
- Family: Accipitridae; Vieillot, 1816

Subfamilies
- Elaninae; Polyboroidinae; Gypaetinae; Perninae; Circaetinae; Aegypiinae; Aquilinae; Harpiinae; Lophospizinae; Accipitrinae; Harpaginae; Buteoninae

= Accipitridae =

Accipitridae Temporal range: 50–0 Ma Eocene to present

Family of birds of prey

The Accipitridae (/ˌæksɪˈpɪtrɪdiː, -deɪ/) is one of the four families within the order Accipitriformes, and is a family of small to large birds of prey with strongly hooked bills and variable morphology based on diet. They feed on a range of prey items from insects to medium-sized mammals, with a number feeding on carrion and a few feeding on fruit. The Accipitridae have a cosmopolitan distribution, being found on all the world's continents (except Antarctica) and a number of oceanic island groups. Some species are migratory. The family contains 256 species which are divided into 12 subfamilies and 75 genera.

Many well-known birds of prey such as buzzard, eagles, harriers, hawks, kites, and Old World vultures are included in this group. The osprey is usually placed in a separate family (Pandionidae), as is the secretary bird (Sagittariidae); the New World vultures are also usually now regarded as a separate family (Cathartidae) or order. Karyotype data indicate the accipitrids analysed are indeed a distinct monophyletic group.

== Systematics and phylogeny ==
In the past the accipitrids have been variously divided into some five to ten subfamilies. Most share a very similar morphology, but many of these groups contain taxa that are more aberrant. These were placed in their respective position more for lack of better evidence than anything else. The phylogenetic layout of the accipitrids was historically a matter of dispute. Molecular studies have removed the phylogenetic uncertainty for most of the species.

The accipitrids are recognizable by a peculiar rearrangement of their chromosomes. Apart from this, morphology and mtDNA cytochrome b sequence data give a confusing picture of these birds' inter-relationships. The hawks, kites, eagles and Old World vultures as presently assigned in all likelihood do not form monophyletic groups.

The genus level cladogram of the Accipiridae shown below is based on a densely sampled molecular phylogenetic study of the Accipitridae by Therese Catanach and collaborators that was published in 2024. The number of species in each genus is based on the list maintained by Frank Gill, Pamela C. Rasmussen and David Donsker on behalf of the International Ornithological Committee (IOC).

- Accipitridae
  - Elaninae
    - Gampsonyx – pearl kite
    - - Chelictinia – scissor-tailed kite
      - Elanus – kites (4 species)
  - - - Polyboroidinae
        Polyboroides – harrier-hawks (2 species)
      - - Gypaetinae
          - Gypohierax – palm-nut vulture
          - - Neophron – Egyptian vulture
            - Gypaetus – bearded vulture
        - Perninae
          - Eutriorchis – Madagascar serpent eagle (placement uncertain)
          - - - Chondrohierax – kites (2 species)
              - Leptodon – kites (2 species)
            - - Aviceda – bazas and cuckoo-hawks (5 species)
              - - Pernis – honey buzzards (4 species)
                - - Elanoides – swallow-tailed kite
                  - - Hamirostra – black-breasted buzzard
                    - - Lophoictinia – square-tailed kite
                      - Henicopernis – honey buzzards (2 species)
    - - - Circaetinae
          - Spilornis – serpent eagles (6 species)
          - - Pithecophaga – Philippine eagle
            - - Terathopius – Bateleur
              - Circaetus – snake eagles (7 species)
        - Aegypiinae
          - - Necrosyrtes – hooded vulture
            - Gyps – vultures (8 species)
          - - Sarcogyps – red-headed vulture
            - - Trigonoceps – white-headed vulture
              - - Torgos – lappet-faced vulture
                - Aegypius – cinereous vulture
      - - Aquilinae
          - - Stephanoaetus – crowned eagle (placement uncertain)
            - Nisaetus – hawk-eagles (10 species)
          - - Spizaetus – hawk-eagle (4 species)
            - - Lophotriorchis – rufous-bellied eagle
              - - Polemaetus – martial eagle
                - - - Lophaetus – long-crested eagle
                    - - Ictinaetus – black eagle
                      - Clanga – spotted eagles (3 species)
                  - - Hieraaetus – eagles (5 species)
                    - Aquila – eagles (11 species)
        - - Harpiinae
            - Harpyopsis – Papuan eagle
            - - Macheiramphus – bat hawk
              - - Morphnus – crested eagle
                - Harpia – harpy eagle
          - - Lophospizinae
              Lophospiza – goshawks (2 species, formerly in Accipiter)
            - - Accipitrinae
                - - Micronisus – gabar goshawk
                  - - Urotriorchis – long-tailed hawk
                    - Melierax – chanting goshawks (3 species)
                - - Kaupifalco – lizard buzzard
                  - - - Aerospiza – sparrowhawk, goshawk (2 species, formerly in Accipiter)
                      - Tachyspiza – goshawks, sparrowhawks (27 species, formerly in Accipiter)
                    - - Erythrotriorchis – goshawks (2 species)
                      - - Accipiter – hawks, sparrowhawks (9 species)
                        - - Astur – hawks, sparrowhawk, goshawks (9 species, formerly in Accipiter)
                          - - Megatriorchis – Doria's hawk
                            - Circus – harriers (16 species)
              - - Harpaginae
                  - Microspizias – hawks (2 species, formerly in Accipiter)
                  - Harpagus – kites (2 species)
                - Buteoninae
                  - - - Milvus – kites (3 species - with split of yellow-billed)
                      - Haliastur – kites (2 species)
                    - - Haliaeetus – sea and fish eagles (4 species)
                      - Icthyophaga – sea and fish eagles (6 species)
                  - - Butastur – buzzards (4 species)
                    - - Ictinia – kites (2 species)
                      - - - Geranospiza – crane hawk
                          - - Busarellus – black-collared hawk
                            - - Rostrhamus – snail kite
                              - Helicolestes – slender-billed kite
                        - - - Morphnarchus – barred hawk
                            - - Cryptoleucopteryx – plumbeous hawk
                              - Buteogallus – hawks and eagles (9 species)
                          - - - Rupornis – roadside hawk (placement uncertain)
                              - Parabuteo – hawks (2 species)
                            - - - Geranoaetus – hawks (3 species)
                                - Pseudastur – hawks (3 species)
                              - - Leucopternis – hawks (3 species)
                                - Buteo – hawks and buzzards (28 species)

=== Taxonomy ===
The family contains 255 species that are divided in 12 subfamilies and 75 genera.

- Elaninae
  - Gampsonyx – pearl kite
  - Chelictinia – scissor-tailed kite
  - Elanus – kites (4 species)
- Polyboroidinae
  - Polyboroides – harrier-hawks (2 species)
- Gypaetinae
  - Gypohierax – palm-nut vulture
  - Neophron – Egyptian vulture
  - Gypaetus – bearded vulture
- Perninae
  - Eutriorchis – Madagascar serpent eagle (placement uncertain)
  - Chondrohierax – kites (2 species)
  - Leptodon – kites (2 species)
  - Aviceda – bazas and cuckoo-hawks (5 species)
  - Pernis – honey buzzards (4 species)
  - Elanoides – swallow-tailed kite
  - Hamirostra – black-breasted buzzard
  - Lophoictinia – square-tailed kite
  - Henicopernis – honey buzzards (2 species)
- Circaetinae
  - Spilornis – serpent eagles (6 species)
  - Pithecophaga – Philippine eagle
  - Terathopius – Bateleur
  - Circaetus – snake eagles (7 species)
- Aegypiinae
  - Necrosyrtes – hooded vulture
  - Gyps – vultures (8 species)
  - Sarcogyps – red-headed vulture
  - Trigonoceps – white-headed vulture
  - Torgos – lappet-faced vulture
  - Aegypius – cinereous vulture
- Aquilinae
  - Stephanoaetus – crowned eagle (placement uncertain)
  - Nisaetus – hawk-eagles (10 species)
  - Spizaetus – hawk-eagle (4 species)
  - Lophotriorchis – rufous-bellied eagle
  - Polemaetus – martial eagle
  - Lophaetus – long-crested eagle
  - Ictinaetus – black eagle
  - Clanga – spotted eagles (3 species)
  - Hieraaetus – eagles (5 species)
  - Aquila – eagles (11 species)
- Harpiinae
  - Harpyopsis – Papuan eagle
  - Macheiramphus – bat hawk
  - Morphnus – crested eagle
  - Harpia – harpy eagle
- Lophospizinae
  - Lophospiza – goshawks (2 species, formerly in Accipiter)
- Accipitrinae
  - Micronisus – gabar goshawk
  - Urotriorchis – long-tailed hawk
  - Melierax – chanting goshawks (3 species)
  - Kaupifalco – lizard buzzard
  - Aerospiza – sparrowhawk, goshawk (2 species, formerly in Accipiter)
  - Tachyspiza – goshawks, sparrowhawks (27 species, formerly in Accipiter)
  - Erythrotriorchis – goshawks (2 species)
  - Accipiter – hawks, sparrowhawks (9 species)
  - Astur – hawks, sparrowhawk, goshawks (9 species, formerly in Accipiter)
  - Megatriorchis – Doria's hawk
  - Circus – harriers (16 species)
- Harpaginae
  - Microspizias – hawks (2 species, formerly in Accipiter)
  - Harpagus – kites (2 species)
- Buteoninae
  - Milvus – kites (3 species - with split of yellow-billed)
  - Haliastur – kites (2 species)
  - Haliaeetus – sea and fish eagles (4 species)
  - Icthyophaga – sea and fish eagles (6 species)
  - Butastur – buzzards (4 species)
  - Ictinia – kites (2 species)
  - Geranospiza – crane hawk
  - Busarellus – black-collared hawk
  - Rostrhamus – snail kite
  - Helicolestes – slender-billed kite
  - Morphnarchus – barred hawk
  - Cryptoleucopteryx – plumbeous hawk
  - Buteogallus – hawks and eagles (9 species)
  - Rupornis – roadside hawk (placement uncertain)
  - Parabuteo – hawks (2 species)
  - Geranoaetus – hawks (3 species)
  - Pseudastur – hawks (3 species)
  - Leucopternis – hawks (3 species)
  - Buteo – hawks and buzzards (28 species)
- Extinct, placement with Buteoninae uncertain
  - †Bermuteo – Bermuda hawk

=== Fossil record ===
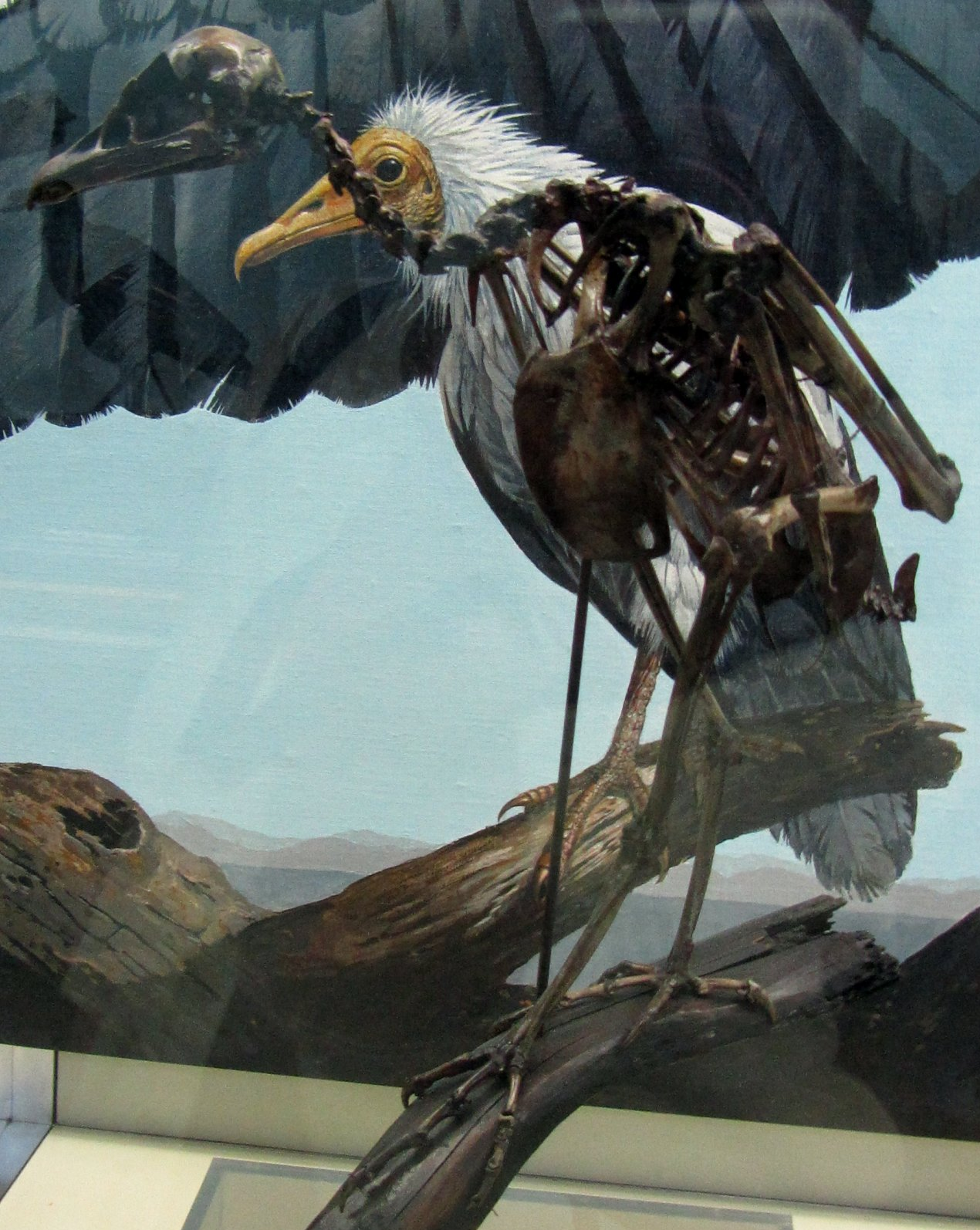
Neophrontops americanus fossil

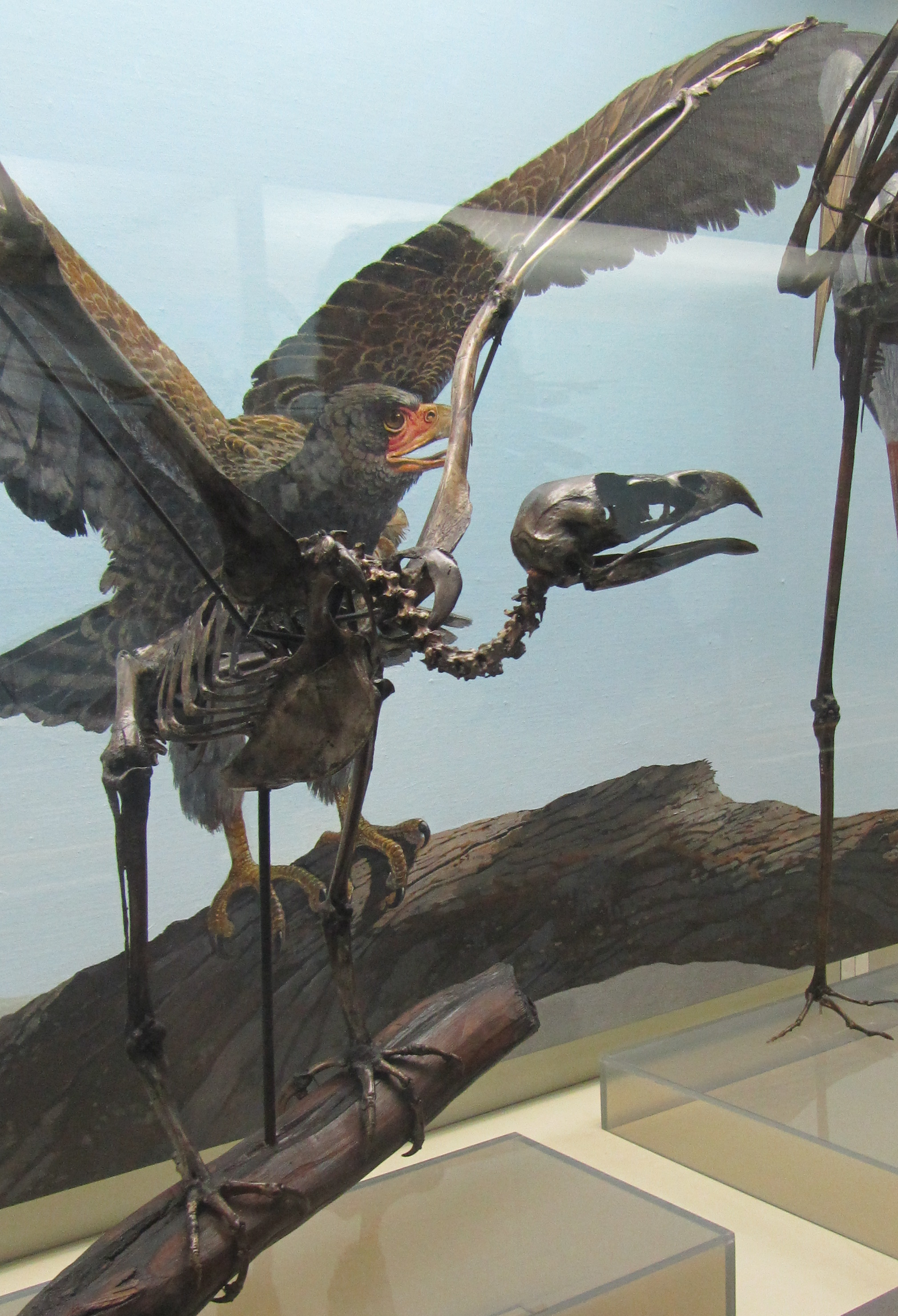
Neogyps errans fossil

As with most other birds of prey, the fossil record of this group is fairly complete from the latter Eocene onwards (c.35 mya), with modern genera being well documented since the Early Oligocene, or around 30 mya.

- Milvoides (Late Eocene of England)
- Aquilavus (Late Eocene/Early Oligocene – Early Miocene of France)
- Palaeocircus (Late Eocene/Early Oligocene of France)
- Aviraptor (Early Oligocene of Poland)
- Palaeastur (Agate Fossil Beds, Early Miocene of Sioux County, US)
- Pengana (Early Miocene of Riversleigh, Australia)
- Promilio (Agate Fossil Beds Early Miocene of Sioux County, US)
- Proictinia (Early – Late Miocene/Early Pliocene of C and SE US)
- Neophrontops (Early/Middle Miocene – Late Pleistocene) – formerly in Neophron
- Mioaegypius (Xiacaowan Middle Miocene of Sihong, China)
- Mioaetus (Miocene of Germany)
- Apatosagittarius (Late Miocene of Nebraska, US)
- Gansugyps (Liushu Late Miocene of China)
- Palaeoborus (Miocene)
- Qiluornis (Miocene of Shandong, China)
- Garganoaetus (Early Pliocene of Gargano Peninsula, Italy)
- Dynatoaetus (Pliocene – Pleistocene of South Australia, Australia)
- Amplibuteo (Late Pliocene of Peru – Late Pleistocene of southern North America and Cuba) – may belong to extant genus Harpyhaliaetus
- Neogyps
- Palaeohierax – includes "Aquila" gervaisii

Accipitrids are known since Early Eocene times, or about from 50 mya onwards, but these early remains are too fragmentary and/or basal to properly assign a place in the phylogeny. Likewise, molecular methods are of limited value in determining evolutionary relationships of and within the accipitrids. The group may have originated on either side of the Atlantic, which during that time was only 60–80% its present width. As evidenced by fossils like Pengana, some 25 mya, accipitrids in all likelihood rapidly acquired a global distribution, initially probably extending even to Antarctica.

- Accipitridae gen. et sp. indet. (Huerfano Early Eocene of Huerfano County, US)
- Accipitridae gen. et sp. indet. (Borgloon Early Oligocene of Hoogbutsel, Belgium)
- Accipitridae gen. et sp. indet. (Bathans Early/Middle Miocene of Otago, New Zealand)
- Accipitridae gen. et sp. indet. MPEF-PV-2523 (Puerto Madryn Late Miocene of Estancia La Pastosa, Argentina)
- "Aquila" danana (Snake Creek Late Miocene/Early Pliocene of Loup Fork, US) – formerly also Geranoaetus or Buteo
- Accipitridae gen. et sp. indet. (Early/Middle Pliocene of Kern County, US) – Parabuteo?
- Accipitridae gen. et sp. indet. (Late Pliocene/Early Pleistocene of Ibiza, Mediterranean) – Buteo?
- Accipitridae gen. et sp. indet. (Egypt)

Specimen AMNH FR 2941, a left coracoid from the Late Eocene Irdin Manha Formation of Chimney Butte (Inner Mongolia), was initially assessed as a basal mid-sized buteonine; it is today considered to be more likely to belong in the Gruiformes genus Eogrus. The Early Oligocene genus Cruschedula was formerly thought to belong to Spheniscidae, however reexamination of the holotype in 1943 resulted in the genus being placed in Accipitridae. Further examination in 1980 resulted in placement as Aves incertae sedis.

== Morphology ==
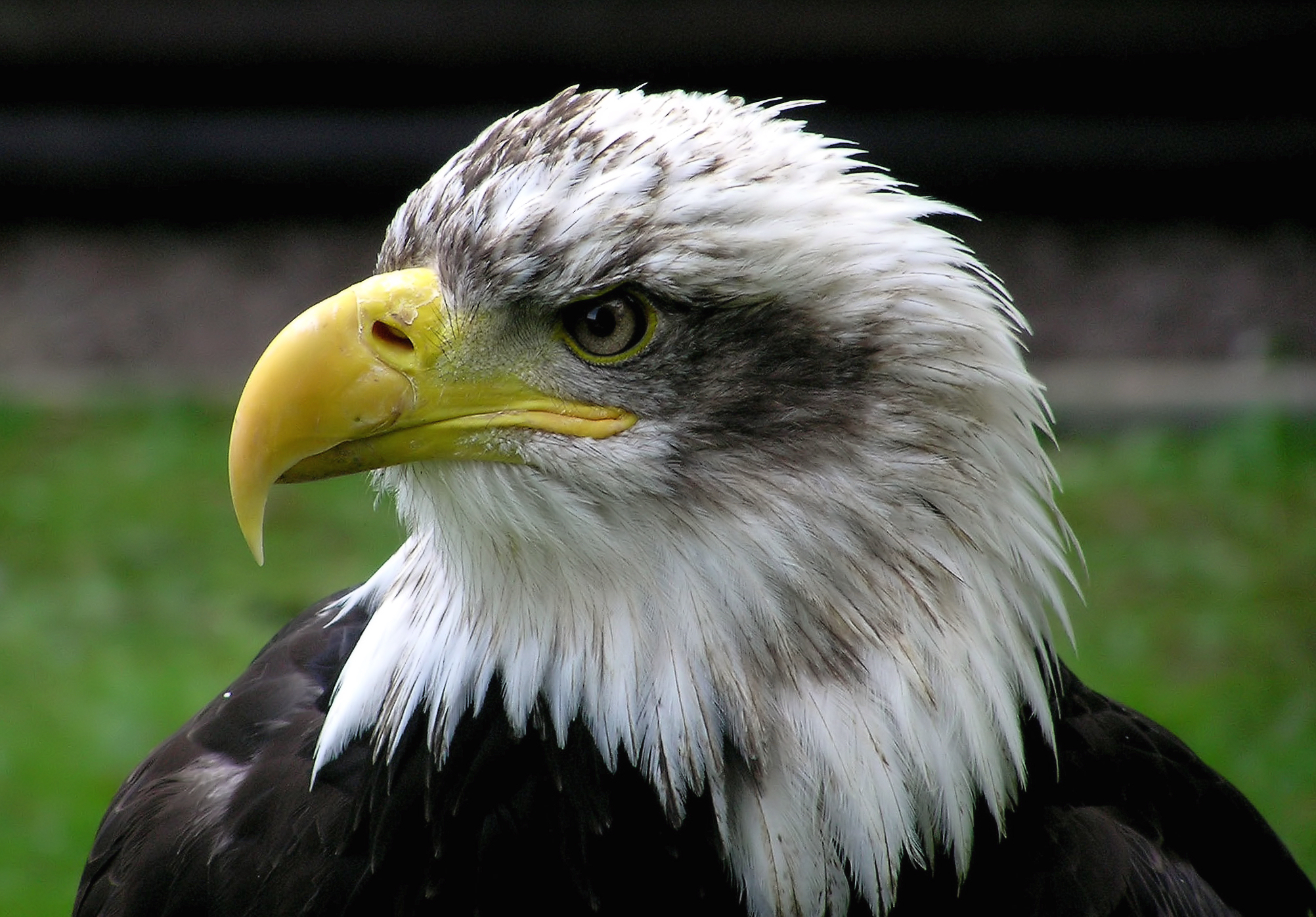
Portrait of a subadult bald eagle, showing its strongly hooked beak and the cere covering the base of the beak

The Accipitridae are a diverse family with a great deal of variation in size and shape. They range in size from the tiny pearl kite (Gampsonyx swainsonii) and little sparrowhawk (Accipiter minullus), both of which are 23 cm (9 in) in length and weigh about 85 g (3 oz), to the cinereous vulture (Aegypius monachus), which measures up to 120 cm (47 in) and weighs up to 14 kg (31 lbs). Wingspan can vary from 39 cm (15 in) in the little sparrowhawk to more than 300 cm (120 in) in the cinereous and Himalayan vultures (Gyps himalayensis). In these extreme species, wing chord length can range from 113 to 890 mm (4.4 to 35.0 in) and culmen length from 11 to 88 mm (0.43 to 3.46 in). Until the 14th century, even these huge vultures were surpassed by the extinct Haast's eagle (Hieraaetus moorei) of New Zealand, which is estimated to have measured up to 140 cm (55 in) and to have weighed 15 to 16.5 kg (33 to 36 lb) in the largest females. In terms of body mass, the Accipitridae are the most diverse family of birds and may also be in terms of some aspects of linear size diversity, although lag behind the true parrots and pheasant family in length diversity. Most accipitrids exhibit sexual dimorphism in size, although, unusually for birds, it is the females that are larger than the males. This sexual difference in size is most pronounced in active species that hunt birds, such as the Accipiter hawks, in which the size difference averages 25–50%. In a majority of species, such as generalist hunters and rodent-, reptile-, fish-, and insect-hunting specialists, the dimorphism is less, usually between a 5% to 30% size difference. In the carrion-eating Old World vultures and snail eating kites, the difference is largely non-existent, though sometimes the female may average slightly heavier.

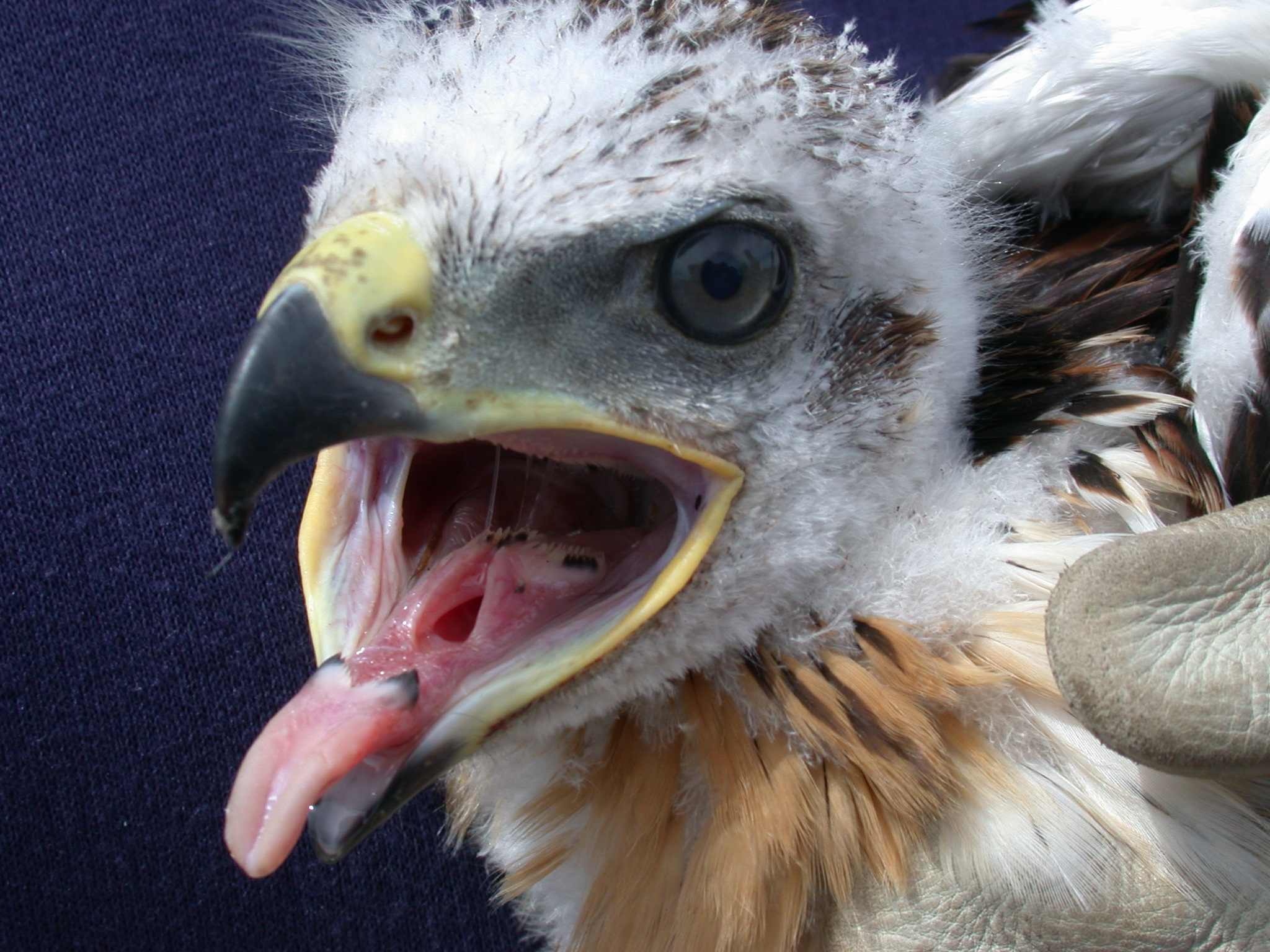
Young ferruginous hawk showing the inside of the mouth

The beaks of accipitrids are strong and hooked (sometimes very hooked, as in the hook-billed kite or snail kite). In some species, there is a notch or 'tooth' in the upper mandible. In all accipitrids, the base of the upper mandible is covered by a fleshy membrane called the cere, which is usually yellow in colour. The tarsi of different species vary by diet; those of bird-hunting species, such as sparrowhawks, are long and thin, whilst species that hunt large mammals have much thicker, stronger tarsi, and the tarsi of the snake-eagles have thick scales to protect from bites.

The plumage of the Accipitridae can be striking, but rarely utilises bright colours; most birds use combinations of white, grey, buff, brown and black. Overall they tend to be paler below, which helps them seem less conspicuous when seen from below. There is seldom sexual dimorphism in plumage, when it occurs the males are brighter or the females resemble juveniles. In many species juveniles have a distinctly different plumage. Some accipitrids mimic the plumage patterns of other hawks and eagles. Resembling a less dangerous species may fool prey; resembling a more dangerous species may reduce mobbing by other birds. Several species of accipitrid have crests used in signalling, and even species without crests can raise the feathers of the crown when alarmed or excited. In contrast most of the Old World vultures possess bare heads without feathers; this is thought to prevent soiling on the feathers and aid in thermoregulation.

The senses of the Accipitridae are adapted to hunting (or scavenging), and in particular their vision is exceptional, with some large accipitrids such as the wedge-tailed eagle and Old World vultures having over twice the visual acuity of a typical human. Large eyes with two foveae provide binocular vision and a "hawk eye" for movement and distance judging. In addition the Accipitridae have the largest pectens of any birds. The eyes are tube shaped and cannot move much in their sockets. In addition to excellent vision many species have excellent hearing, but unlike in owls sight is generally the principal sense used for hunting. Hearing may be used to locate prey hidden in vegetation, but sight is still used to catch the prey. Although they rely primarily on vision, Accipitridae do have functioning olfactory systems, which they make use of in a variety of contexts.

== Diet and behavior ==
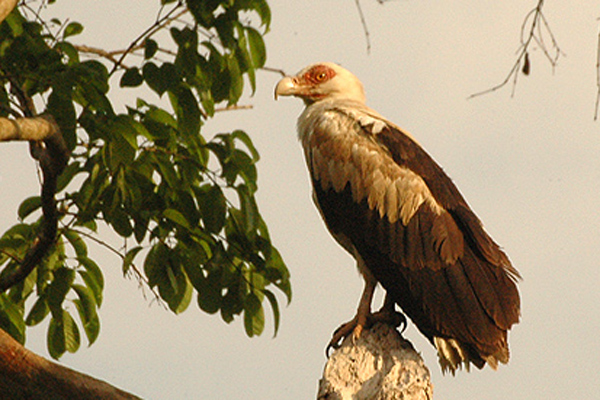
The palm-nut vulture is an unusual frugivorous accipitrid, but will also consume fish, particularly dead fish

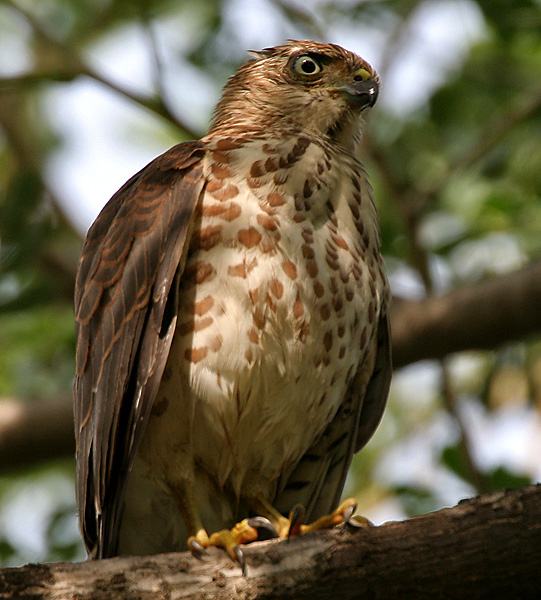
Shikra Accipiter badius in Hyderabad, India

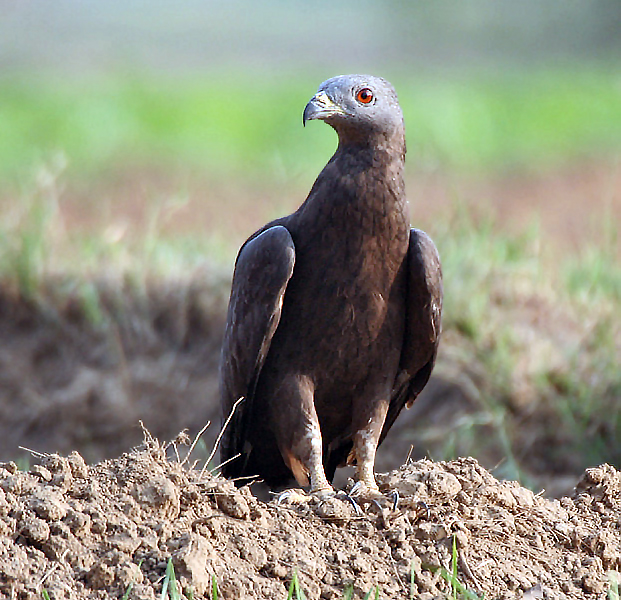
Oriental honey-buzzard Pernis ptilorhyncus

Accipitrids are predominantly predators and most species actively hunt for their prey. Prey is usually captured and killed in the powerful talons of the raptor and then carried off to be torn apart with a hooked bill for eating or feeding to nestlings. A majority of accipitrids are opportunistic predators that will take any prey that they can kill. However, most have a preference for a certain type of prey, which in harriers and the numerous buteonine hawks (including more than 30 species in the genus Buteo) tends towards small mammals such as rodents.

Among the raptors that mainly favor small mammals, harriers generally hunt by hovering over openings until they detect their prey and descend upon them. Due to the specificity of their hunting style, prey preferences, and habitat preferences, usually only one harrier species tends to be found per region.

Buteonine hawks usually watch for prey from a perch but most species will also readily hunt on the wing, including from a high soar. Many buteonines are amongst the most generalized feeders, often feeding on any active small animal they find, and will generally eat whatever diurnal rodent or lagomorph is most locally common. Some buteonines, however, are more specialized, such as certain species in the genus Buteogallus, which have evolved to specialize in feeding on crabs. Larger Buteogallus, namely the solitary eagles, and Geranoaetus are much larger than other buteonines and seem to have become avian apex predators of specific habitat niches—for example, savanna, cloud forest and páramo in South America—and are thus honorary "eagles".

In Accipiter hawks (the most species-rich accipitrid genus with nearly 50 extant species), prey is mainly other birds. Accipiters are in general forest- and thicket-dwelling species. Accipiter hawks usually ambush birds in dense vegetation, a dangerous hunting method that requires great agility. Many smaller tropical species of Accipiter eat nearly equal portions of insects and reptiles and amphibians as they do of birds while some of the larger species have become more generalized and may feed extensively on rodents and lagomorphs, as well as other various non-avian animals.

Most accipitrids will supplement their diet with non-putrid carrion, but none are specialized for this as well as the 14–16 species of vultures, which have evolved very large bodies (which leave them equipped to fill their crop with carrion); weaker, less specialized feet than other accipitrids; large wingspans to spend long periods of time in flight over openings scanning for carcasses; and complex social behavior in order to establish a mixed species hierarchy at carrion. The New World vultures have attained several similar characteristics, but only through convergent evolution, and are seemingly not directly related to Old World vultures and other accipitrids. The lammergeier (Gypaetus barbatus) is an aberrant cousin of the Old World vultures that has maintained strong feet that it uses to carry and drop large bones in order to crack them open to feed on bone marrow, their primary food, a technique they also sometimes use for live prey items, like tortoises.

A few species may opportunistically feed on fruit. In one species, the palm-nut vulture (Gypohierax angolensis) (possibly not closely related to other "vultures"), it may form more than half of the diet. Most accipitrids will not eat plant material.

Insects are taken exclusively by around 12 species, in great numbers by 44 additional species, and opportunistically by a great many others. The diet of the honey-buzzards includes not only the adults and young of social insects such as wasps and bees, but the honey and combs from their nests.

The snail kite (Rostrhamus sociabilis), slender-billed kite (Helicolestes hamatus) and hook-billed kites (Chondrohierax uncinatus) are specialists in consuming snails, which usually constitute 50–95% of their diet. Other "kites"—a loose assemblance of smallish raptors, many of which are strong, buoyant fliers—are divided into two groups. One, exclusively in the Old World, the milvine or "large" kites, are often quite common, very generalized and often weakly predaceous feeders whereas the other kites, known as elanine or "small" kites and cosmopolitan in distribution, are supremely aerial, active hunters that generally alternate their primary food between insects and small mammals. One species allied with the latter kite group, the bat hawk (Macheiramphus alcinus), has come to specialize in hunting bats.

"Eagles" are several raptors that are not necessarily closely related, but can be broadly defined by large body size (larger than other raptors, excluding vultures) and the taking of typically larger prey, including mid-sized mammals and larger birds. The most diverse group of eagles is the "booted eagles", a variable group of about 38 species defined by their feathering covering their legs (shared by only a couple of buteonine species).

Most accipitrids usually hunt prey smaller than themselves. However, many accipitrids of almost all sizes have been recorded as capturing and then flying with prey of equal weight or even slightly heavier than themselves in their talons, a feat that requires great strength. Occasionally, an eagle or other raptor that kills prey considerably heavier than itself (too heavy for the raptor to carry and fly with) will then have to leave prey at the site of the kill and later return repeatedly to feed or dismember and bring to a perch or nest piece by piece. This has the advantage of providing a surplus of food but has the disadvantage of potentially attracting scavengers or other predators which can steal the kill or even attack the feeding accipitrid. Using this method, accipitrids such as the golden eagle (Aquila chrysaetos), wedge-tailed eagle (Aquila audax), martial eagle (Polemaetus bellicosus) and crowned eagle (Stephanoaetus coronatus) have successfully hunted ungulates, such as deer and antelope, and other large animals (kangaroos and emus in the wedge-tailed) weighing more than 30 kg (66 lb), 7–8 times their own mass. More typical prey for these powerful booted eagle species weigh between 0.5 and 5 kg (1.1 and 11.0 lb).

The Haliaeetus eagles and the osprey (Pandion haliaetus) mainly prefer to prey on fish, which comprising more than 90% of food for the osprey and some fish eagles. These large acciptrids may supplement their diets with aquatic animals other than fish, especially sea eagles, which also hunt large numbers of water birds and are expert kleptoparasites.

Reptiles and amphibians are hunted by almost all variety of acciptrids when the opportunity arises and may be favored over other prey by some eagles, i.e. Spizaetus hawk-eagles and the "eagles" in Buteogallus, and several species of buteonine hawks found in the tropics. Bazas and forest hawks in the genus Accipiter may take reptiles from trees whilst other species may hunt them on the ground. Snakes are the primary prey of the snake-eagles (Circaetus) and serpent-eagles (Spilornis and Dryotriorchis). The mammal-hunting, huge and endangered Philippine eagle (Pithecophaga jefferyi) is most closely related to the snake-eagles. Another striking aberration of the snake-eagle lineage is the bateleur (Terathopius ecaudatus), which has evolved unusually bright plumage in adults, with a huge red cere, red feet, bright yellow bill, and boldly contrasting grey-and-white markings over black plumage. The bateleur feeds extensively on carrion and almost any other feeding opportunity that presents itself.

== Reproductive biology and populations ==
In terms of their reproductive biology and socio-sexual behavior, accipitrids share many characteristics with other extant groups of birds that appear not be directly related, but all of which have evolved to become active predators of other warm-blooded creatures. Some of the characteristics shared with these other groups, including falcons, owls, skuas and shrikes, are sexual dimorphism in size, with the female typically larger than the male; extreme devotion of breeding pairs to each other or to a dedicated nesting site; strict and often ferocious territorial behavior; and, on hatching, occasional competition amongst nestlings, including regular siblicide in several species.

Before the onset of the nesting season, adult accipitrids often devote a majority of their time to excluding other members of their own species and even of other species from their nesting territories. In several species, this occurs by territorial display flights over the border of their breeding ranges. In several forest dwelling varieties, however, vocalizations are used to establish territories. Due to the density of the habitat, display flights are apparently impractical.

While a single devoted breeding pair is considered typical, research has revealed that in varied accipitrids, multiple birds engaging in nesting behavior is more commonly than previously thought. Some harriers have evolved to become polygynous, with a single smaller male breeding with and then helping multiple females raise young. The most extreme known species of accipitrid in terms of sociality is the Harris's hawks (Parabuteo unicinctus), which up to seven fully-grown birds may hunt, nest and brood cooperatively, with the extra birds typically being prior years' offspring of the breeding pair.

Unlike the other two larger groups of raptorial birds, the owls and most falcons, accipitrids typically build their own nest. Nest sites are typically in relatively secure places, such as the crook of a large tree or an ample cliff ledge, and can vary in elevation from the flat ground of prairies or steppe to near the peaks of the tallest mountains. Accipitrids will readily return to use a nest site repeatedly, which has resulted in several of the largest bird's nests known, as a single nest may see decades of use, with more material added each breeding season. The single largest known tree nest known for any animal, belonging to a bald eagle (Haliaeetus leucocephalus), was found to be 6.1 m (20 ft) deep and 2.9 meters (9.5 ft) across, and to weigh 3 short tons (2.7 metric tons). Some species, especially eagles, will build multiple nests for use in alternating years. Although they usually use nests they build themselves, accipitrids sometimes use abandoned nests build by other animals or pirate nests from other birds, typically other types of accipitrid.

Compared to most other types of birds, the stretch from egg-laying to independence in young birds is prolonged. In accipitrids, the breeding season ranges from about two to three months to roughly a year and a half, the latter in some of the larger tropical eagles. Species inhabiting temperate ranges as a rule have shorter breeding seasons due to the shorter stretches of warm weather that facilitates ready capture of prey.

Usually from 2 to 6 eggs are laid in accipitrids, a relatively small clutch, and some species may lay only one egg. In almost all accipitrids, eggs are laid at intervals rather than all at once and in some larger species the intervals can be several days. This results in one of the hatchlings being larger and more advanced in development than its siblings. The benefits of siblicide, which is at least occasionally recorded in many species and almost always occurs in some, such as tropical members of the booted eagle group, is that the smaller siblings are a kind of insurance policy that if the oldest, strongest nestling dies, one of the smaller siblings may take its place. In most species that have displayed siblicide, times of food plenty may result in two or more the nestlings being successfully raised to fledging.

In most accipitrids, the smaller males typically obtain food both for the incubating and brooding female and the nestlings. Males, however, occasionally take a shift incubating or even more sporadically brooding the nestlings, which allows the female to hunt. Most accipitrids feed their nestlings strips of meat or whole prey items, but most vultures feed their nestlings via regurgitation.

Fledging often takes considerable effort for young birds and may take several weeks as opposed to days in many other types of birds. Once independent of their parents, young accipitrids often most wander for considerable stretches of time, ranging from 1 to 5 years, before they attain maturity. Most accipitrids have distinct plumages in their immature stage, which presumably serves as a visual cue to others of their species and may allow them to avoid territorial fights. Shortly after attaining mature plumages, pairs form, with a male typically displaying, often in flight but sometimes vocally, to win over a female. Many accipitrids breed with the same mate for several years or for life, although this is not the case for all species and, if a mate dies, the widowed bird will typically try to find another mate the next breeding season.

== See also ==
- List of Accipitriformes

== Sources ==
- Alcover, Josep Antoni (1989). "Les Aus fòssils de la Cova de Ca Na Reia ["The fossil birds of Ca Na Reia cave"]" (pdf). Endins (in Catalan) (14–15): 95–100. ISSN 0211-2515. OCLC 41447612.
- Amaral, Karina Felipe; Jorge, Wilham (2003). "The chromosomes of the Order Falconiformes: a review" (PDF). Ararajuba. 11 (1): 65–73. ISSN 0103-5657. OCLC 23686049. Archived from the original (PDF) on 14 April 2011.
- Brathwaite, D. H. (1992). "Notes on the weight, flying ability, habitat, and prey of Haast's Eagle (Harpagornis moorei)" (PDF). Notornis. 39 (4): 239–247. Archived from the original (PDF) on 2012-01-19.
- Cracraft, Joel (1969). "Notes on fossil hawks (Accipitridae)" (PDF). Auk. 86 (2): 353–354. doi:10.2307/4083514. JSTOR 4083514.
- de Boer, L. E. M. (1975). "Karyological heterogeneity in the Falconiformes (aves)". Cellular and Molecular Life Sciences. 31 (10): 1138–1139. doi:10.1007/BF02326755. PMID 1204722.
- del Hoyo, J.; Elliott, A.; Sargatal, J., eds. (1994). Handbook of the Birds of the World. Vol. 2. Barcelona: Lynx Edicions. ISBN 84-87334-15-6.
  - Thiollay, J. M. "Family Accipitridae (Hawks and Eagles)". In del Hoyo, Elliott & Sargatal (1994).
- Federico, Concetta; Cantarella, Catia Daniela; Scavo, Cinzia; Saccone, Salvatore; Bed'hom, Bertrand; Bernardi, Giorgio (2005). "Avian genomes: Different karyotypes but a similar distribution of the GC-richest chromosome regions at interphase". Chromosome Research. 13 (8): 785–793. doi:10.1007/s10577-005-1012-7. PMID 16331410. S2CID 32893842.
- Ferguson-Lees, James; Christie, David A. (2001). Raptors of the World. Illustrated by Kim Franklin, David Mead, and Philip Burton. Houghton Mifflin. ISBN 978-0-618-12762-7.
- Korpimäki, E. (1988). "Factors promoting polygyny in European birds of prey—a hypothesis". Oecologia. 77 (2): 278–285. Bibcode:1988Oecol..77..278K. doi:10.1007/bf00379199. PMID 28310385. S2CID 20541834.
- Lerner, H. R. L.; Mindell, D. P. (November 2005). "Phylogeny of eagles, Old World vultures, and other Accipitridae based on nuclear and mitochondrial DNA" (PDF). Molecular Phylogenetics and Evolution. 37 (2): 327–346. Bibcode:2005MolPE..37..327L. doi:10.1016/j.ympev.2005.04.010. ISSN 1055-7903. PMID 15925523. Archived (PDF) from the original on 2022-10-09.
- Miller, L. H. (1931). "Bird Remains from the Kern River Pliocene of California" (PDF). Condor. 33 (2): 70–72. doi:10.2307/1363312. JSTOR 1363312.
- Nanda, I.; Karl, E.; Volobouev, V.; Griffin, D.K.; Schartl, M.; Schmid, M. (2006). "Extensive gross genomic rearrangements between chicken and Old World vultures (Falconiformes: Accipitridae)". Cytogenetic and Genome Research. 112 (3–4): 286–295. doi:10.1159/000089883. PMID 16484785. S2CID 25441181.
- Negro, J. J. (2008). "Two aberrant serpent-eagles may be visual mimics of bird-eating raptors". Ibis. 150 (2): 307–314. doi:10.1111/j.1474-919X.2007.00782.x. hdl:10261/34063.
- Olson, S. L. (1985). "Faunal Turnover in South American Fossil Avifaunas: The Insufficiencies of the Fossil Record" (PDF). Evolution. 39 (5): 1174–1177. doi:10.2307/2408747. JSTOR 2408747. PMID 28561505. Archived (PDF) from the original on 2022-10-09.
- Paton, P. W. C.; Messina, F. J.; Griffin, C. R. (1994). "A Phylogenetic Approach to Reversed Size Dimorphism in Diurnal Raptors". Oikos. 71 (3): 492–498. Bibcode:1994Oikos..71..492P. doi:10.2307/3545837. JSTOR 3545837.
- Shiu, H. J.; Tokita, K. I.; Morishita, E.; Hiraoka, E.; Wu, Y.; Nakamura, H.; Higuchi, H. (2006). "Route and site fidelity of two migratory raptors: Grey-faced Buzzards Butastur indicus and Honey-buzzards Pernis apivorus". Ornithological Science. 5 (2): 151–156. doi:10.2326/osj.5.151.
- Smith, Richard (2003). "Les vertébrés terrestres de l'Oligocène inférieur de Belgique (Formation de Borgloon, MP 21): inventaire et interprétation des données actuelles. [Early Oligocene terrestrial vertebrates from Belgium (Borgloon Formation, MP 21): catalog and interpretation of recent data.]" (PDF). Coloquios de Paleontología (in French). E1: 647–657. ISSN 1132-1660. OCLC 55101786. Archived (PDF) from the original on 9 June 2011.
- Thomson, A. L.; Moreau, R. E. (1957). "Feeding Habits of the Palm-Nut Vulture Gypoheerax". Ibis. 99 (4): 608–613. doi:10.1111/j.1474-919X.1957.tb03053.x.
- Ward, J.; McCafferty, D.; Houston, D.; Ruxton, G. (2008). "Why do vultures have bald heads? The role of postural adjustment and bare skin areas in thermoregulation". Journal of Thermal Biology. 33 (3): 168–173. Bibcode:2008JTBio..33..168W. doi:10.1016/j.jtherbio.2008.01.002.
- Wetmore, Alexander (1934). "Fossil birds from Mongolia and China" (PDF). American Museum Novitates (711): 1–16.
- Wink, M.; Heidrich, P.; Fentzloff, C. (1996). "A mtDNA phylogeny of sea eagles (genus Haliaeetus) based on nucleotide sequences of the cytochrome b gene" (PDF). Biochemical Systematics and Ecology. 24 (7–8): 783–791. Bibcode:1996BioSE..24..783W. doi:10.1016/S0305-1978(96)00049-X.
- Worthy, T. H.; Tennyson, A. J. D.; Jones, C.; McNamara, J. A.; Douglas, B. J. (2006). "Miocene Waterfowl and Other Birds from Central Otago, New Zealand" (PDF). J. Syst. Palaeontol. 5: 1–39. doi:10.1017/S1477201906001957. hdl:2440/43360. S2CID 85230857.
