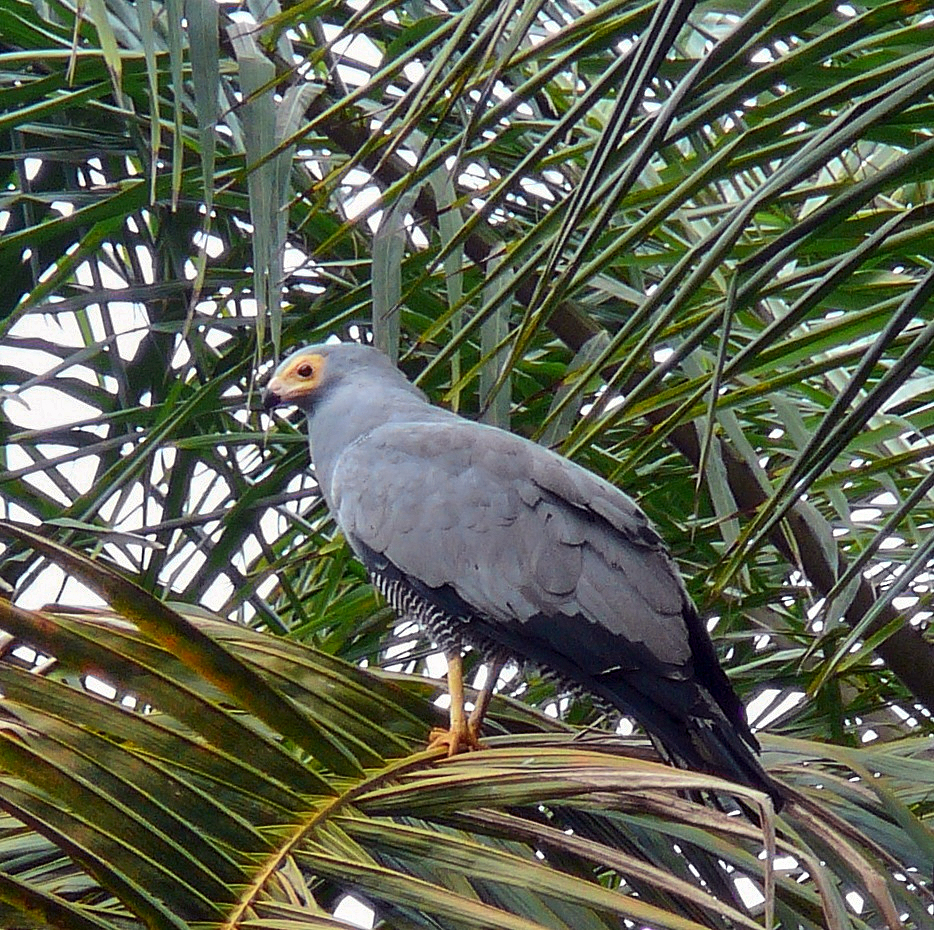
- African harrier-hawk (Polyboroides typus)

Scientific classification
- Kingdom: Animalia
- Phylum: Chordata
- Class: Aves
- Order: Accipitriformes
- Family: Accipitridae
- Subfamily: Polyboroidinae
- Genus: Polyboroides; A. Smith, 1829

Type species
- Polyboroides typus A. Smith, 1829

Species
- See text

= Polyboroides =

Genus of birds

Polyboroides is a genus of bird of prey in the family Accipitridae. This genus has two recognized species found in Sub-Saharan Africa and Madagascar. The two species are allopatric and restricted to the Afrotropical realm. They are generally known as harrier-hawks.

== Etymology ==
Polyboroides: Genus Polyborus Vieillot, 1816; Greek: -οιδης -oidēs "resembling".

== Species ==
The genus Polyboroides has two recognized species:

Genus Polyboroides – A. Smith, 1829 – two species
Common name	Scientific name and subspecies	Range	Size and ecology	IUCN status and estimated population
African harrier-hawk	Polyboroides typus (Scopoli, 1786) Two subspecies: P. t. typus - Smith, A, 1829; P. t. pectoralis - Sharpe, 1903	Sub-Saharan Africa	Size: Habitat: Diet:	LC
Madagascar harrier-hawk	Polyboroides radiatus Smith, 1829	Madagascar	Size: Habitat: Diet:	LC

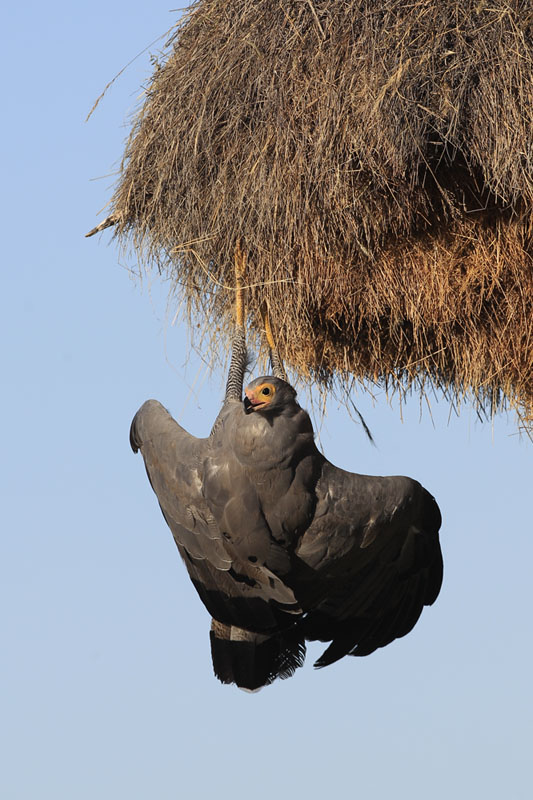
Adult African harrier-hawk hunting at a weaver colony in Etosha NP. Note the double-jointed legs enabling it to hang downwards and yet reach upwards with its beak.

== See also ==
- Harrier (bird)
