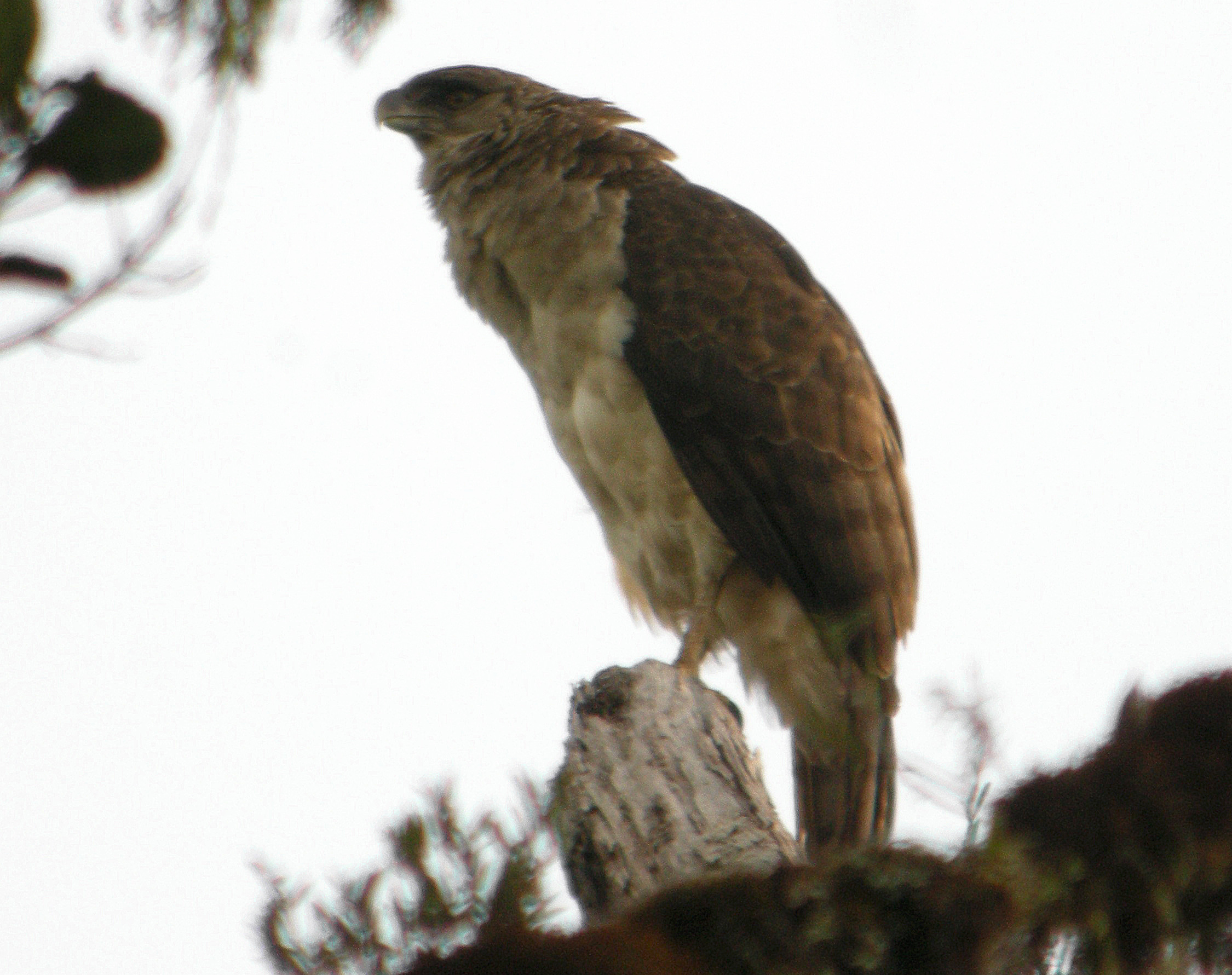

Conservation status
- Vulnerable (IUCN 3.1)

Scientific classification
- Kingdom: Animalia
- Phylum: Chordata
- Class: Aves
- Order: Accipitriformes
- Family: Accipitridae
- Subfamily: Harpiinae
- Genus: Harpyopsis; Salvadori, 1875
- Species: H. novaeguineae

Binomial name
- Harpyopsis novaeguineae Salvadori, 1875

= Papuan eagle =

Species of bird

The Papuan eagle (Harpyopsis novaeguineae) is a large bird of prey. It is also known by several other names, including Papuan harpy eagle, New Guinea eagle, New Guinea harpy eagle, or kapul eagle, the latter name from the local name for a usually arboreal marsupial that the eagle is known to regularly hunt. This is an endemic species to New Guinea, and it can occasionally be found throughout the island. This is a forest-dwelling species, usually occurring in mature rainforest. The Papuan eagle is a fairly little-known species for a large eagle; however, it is known to prey on a wide range of prey, probably by and large mammals and birds from small to quite large sizes. Unique amongst eagles, the Papuan eagle is a surprisingly fast and agile terrestrial avian predator and is capable of chasing down prey on the forest floor. What little study has been conducted about its breeding habits suggests it nests in a large forest tree, perhaps every other year. The Papuan eagle is probably naturally scarce, but it is under the threat of habitat destruction by deforestation, as well as hunting. Due to its small and declining population, the species has been classified as vulnerable by the IUCN.

== Distribution and habitat ==
The Papuan eagle is endemic to New Guinea. It has been seen in almost every part of the island, from peninsular Indonesian Papua in the west to throughout the nation of Papua New Guinea in the east. The main native habitat inhabited by Papuan eagles are undisturbed tropical rainforests. However, they will also utilize gallery forests, monsoon scrub forest and dry woodland. The species has even been reported to sometimes turn up in forest edge and relatively open areas such as gardens, but more extensive research that this is extraordinarily rare if it does even occur. They can live at several elevations from sea level up to regularly 2,000 m (6,600 ft), but occasionally have reported at elevations ranging from 3,200 to 3,700 m (10,500 to 12,100 ft). At times, it has been considered a bird that prefers steeper sloped or ridged parts of the forest.

== Description ==
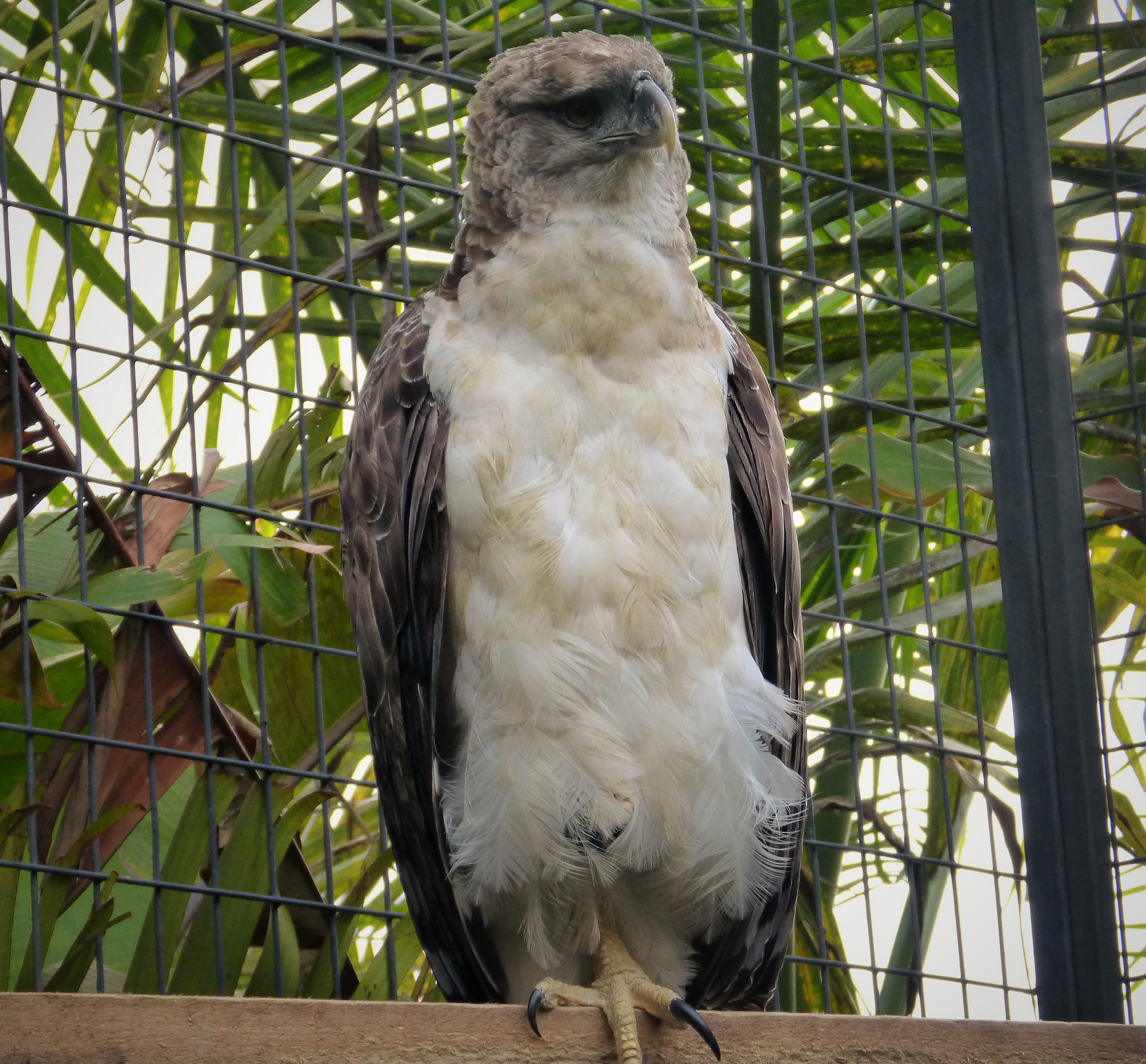
A Papuan eagle as seen in captivity.

The New Guinea eagle is a fairly large eagle and very large raptor. Though the sexes are similar, the female is slightly larger than the male, with a range up to a 34% size difference. In total length, adults range from 75 to 90 cm (30 to 35 in). The relatively short but broad wingspan, as expected in forest-dwelling raptors, is 121 to 157 cm (4 ft 0 in to 5 ft 2 in). The body mass widely reported is relatively light for so large a raptor at 1.6 to 2.4 kg (3.5 to 5.3 lb). This may be due in no small part to its extremely long tail, which measures 384 to 394 mm (15.1 to 15.5 in) in males and 410 to 435 mm (16.1 to 17.1 in) in females. The weights reported according to some authors probably underrepresent their size, especially those of full-grown females, and their body size range based on linear dimensions (the weighed birds could have been all smaller males). This species also possesses an exceptional long tarsus, which may rival the Philippine eagle, which weighs about three times more than the Papuan eagle, as the longest of all living eagles at 123 to 145 mm (4.8 to 5.7 in). Meanwhile, the wing chord measures 368 to 442 mm (14.5 to 17.4 in) in males and 450 to 494 mm (17.7 to 19.4 in). A single male had a culmen length of 48 mm (1.9 in).

At all ages, Papuan eagles are a greyish brown raptor with a creamy-coloured underside. Adults also have obscure darker bars on the underside. The back bears faint buff and white edging, which in good light can make these areas appear somewhat scaled. The tail is of the same colour as the back with a whitish tip with four or five blackish bands (the subterminal one being broad), which are also present on the cream-colored undertail. The juvenile is similar to the adult, but is of a slightly paler grey-brown colour above with a slightly more buff colouring on the underside. Also, the juvenile's tail has seven or eight narrower bars and no subterminal band. The short but full crest of this species can be conspicuous, while the face may suggest a ruff. The Papuan eagle has rather peculiar proportions, with a prominent head, powerful, large and black bill and cere, large eyes with brown to orange irises, a chesty build, extremely elongated, bare legs of a brownish-grey to dull orange colour, very long tail, and powerful feet with sharp claws. When seen sitting about the ground, it has an upright posture and an almost bustard-like appearance due to its unusual structure. Based on fragmentary data from captivity, both the eye colour and the leg colour may grow more vivid with age, with one record-aged male of 30 years old having red eyes. In flight, the upperside is homogeneously all grey-brown and the underwings are all cream like the underside, but for barred grey but dull flight feathers. Due to its unusual appearance it is unlikely to be mistaken for the other large, widespread New Guinea eagle, Gurney's eagle, a more typical aquiline-type eagle in appearance with significantly different proportions and form as well as clearly much darker dorsal colour (while juvenile Gurney's are far more pale and less bicolored). Additionally, Gurney's eagles dwells in forests as well but often tend to occur at slightly lower elevations than Papuan eagles and may be more prone to occurring near varying and less dense habitats. The wedge-tailed eagle and the white-bellied sea eagle are both very range-restricted in New Guinea and frequent drastically different habitats than the Papuan eagle. The more common long-tailed honey buzzard is much smaller than the Papuan eagle, with a different wing shape, a well-streaked underside and wing linings and broadly banded flight feathers and tail. Despite their distinctive appearance, the honey buzzard is not infrequently mistaken for a Papuan eagle in the dense, dark forests.

=== Voice ===
The call of the Papuan eagle is a startlingly loud uumpph or okh, suggesting a very loud hiccup or taut bowstring. Their call is said to carry quite well through the forest. The main call is occasionally followed by a somewhat chicken-like but more loud and powerful buk-buk-buk. Also, a deep resonant bungh-bungh may be uttered at 2-3 second intervals. A high-pitched whining call has also been reported. Pairs may call at dawn and dusk and even call during night. The greater coucal may at times produce a similar call, but has a more musical and descending-type call.

=== Taxonomy ===
The Papuan eagle is the only member of the genus Harpyopsis. Despite its isolated range, the Papuan eagle was once thought to be related to the harpy eagle and the Philippine eagle based on similarities of morphology to these larger, but otherwise somewhat similar forest eagles. However, genetic studies showed that the Philippine eagle is actually derived from the lineage of the snake eagles, so is similar only through convergent evolution. The genetic data, however, showed that the Papuan eagle does appear to possess a highly similar genetic sequence to those of harpy and crested eagle, despite these neotropical species being particularly disparate in range from New Guinea (the crested eagle in particular is fairly similar in size and form to the Papuan, but is of more slender form with less extreme elongation of its legs and tail). Therefore, the Papuan eagle forms a clade with the harpy and crested eagles despite each species being distinct enough to retain their own monotypical genera.

== Behaviour and ecology ==
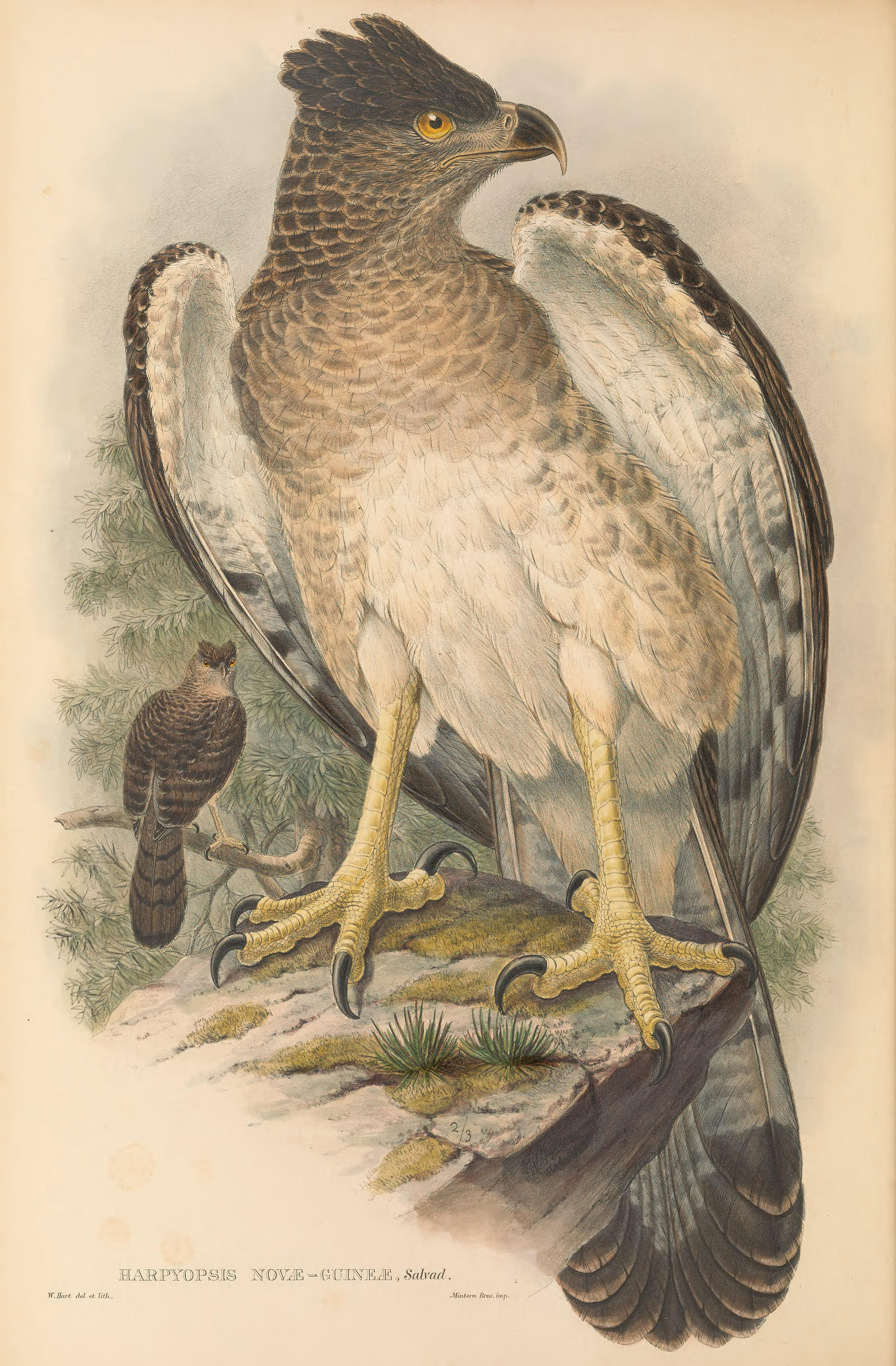
A portrait of the Papuan eagle by William Matthew Hart in The Birds of New Guinea

The Papuan eagle is an elusive forest dweller. Despite old claims that it soars, even claims that it does so frequently, evidence indicates it never engages in soaring flight. Typically, this species is known to perch inconspicuously in thick canopy and can be fairly difficult to see as it often slips away quietly, seemingly to avoid human detection. Due to its occasional tendency to vocalize at night, large eyes, and almost owl-like facial area, this species has at times been hypothesized to be an occasional nocturnal hunter, but the Papuan eagle has never been proven to hunt by night and is now thought to be a diurnal hunter like other eagles. The Papuan eagle is a powerful hunter that uses the still or perch hunting style typical of many forest raptors, gliding from often routine perch sites inconspicuously as possible within the forest. Flights between hunting perches are up to 1,500 m (4,900 ft) but usually as little as 50 to 60 m (160 to 200 ft). This raptor is said to detect terrestrial prey partially through sound by listening for movement in the undergrowth, and while hunting, often bobs its head side to side, and turns it at peculiar angles, seeming to be getting a fix on the prey's location before dropping down. More unconventional hunting styles have been incorporated where the eagle clambers about from branch to branch, stopping to examine several holes or crevices and tearing into clumps of epiphytes. Sometimes Papuan eagles will also shake foliage to force small mammals to poke their heads out. This hunting method is reminiscent of unrelated accipitrids such as harrier hawks and crane hawks, which also possess unusually elongated leg morphology in a possible case of convergent evolution, but the Papuan eagle lacks the unusual leg joints that allow those raptors to bend their legs multiple directions. The Papuan eagle is also known to spend a fair amount of time on the ground and to run with considerable agility and surprising speed, apparently whilst hunting for prey such as megapodes.

The preferred prey appears to be a wide range of mammals. Regularly reported as primary prey are phalangers, tree-kangaroos, common ringtail possums, Dorcopsis and Dorcopsulus as well as woolly rats and giant naked-tailed rats. Phalangers or Kapul in a local language (although this name may sometimes apply to any marsupials), hence its alternative name, are often considered the most important prey. One food study in Crater Mountain Wildlife Management Area reinforced the primary importance of phalangers, as more than half of 29 prey items were these marsupials. However, a different study of the same wildlife management area showed a preference for Dorcopsulus forest wallabies, which comprised 6 of 10 prey items. However, data do indicate the Papuan eagle is an opportunistic predator and can take a wide range of birds including pigeons and doves, hornbills, cockatoos and megapodes. Additionally, incidents of predation on reptiles such as snakes and monitor lizards are known. Additionally, Papuan eagles have been known to hunt small dogs and young pigs. Much of the recorded prey of Papuan eagles is fairly large, most species targeted by them weighing in adults 0.5 to 1 kg (1.1 to 2.2 lb) or considerably more, a Matschie's tree-kangaroo weighing 6 kg (13 lb) was recorded as prey of Papuan eagles. Even larger prey such as dwarf cassowary, which would weigh at least 13.5 kg (30 lb), have also been recorded. Singing dogs, established exotic wild animals analogous to Australia's dingos, are known to steal the bird's kills. An incident of the apparent act of predation by a Papuan eagle on a small child has been considered "thought authentic" by some authors and "very dubious" by others.

The Papuan eagle was thought to become the only remaining top predator of the island after the extinction of local giant monitor lizards and possibly large carnivorous marsupials. It is not known how Papuan eagles co-exist with the similarly sized Gurney's eagles, which also frequents rainforest and appears to select somewhat similar prey, but the Gurney's seems more prone to appearing in lower elevation forests (i.e. reportedly very rare above 1,500 m (4,900 ft) and more likely to visit forest openings. Furthermore, the Gurney's eagle hunts in flight at or slightly above the canopy level (in keeping with its considerably longer wings than the Papuan), very different from any foraging mode utilized by the Papuan eagle.

Very little is known about breeding or pairing behaviour in the Papuan eagle. What it is known suggests it is a typically solitary raptor and forms presumably stable breeding pairs. It appears to breed largely in the dry season, such as April to November. A specimen in breeding condition was recorded in June, actively nest building in April–May and having large nestlings in August. Large, emergent trees appear to be preferred, with some genera the eagles have been known to nest being Eugenia, Syzygium and Aglaia. Usually, trees selected are on a slope and the nest will be placed on a very large one right near the canopy, often over 30 m (98 ft) above the ground. Nests in one study were found to be in trees an average of 8.7 m (29 ft) taller than the surrounding trees in the forest, with fewer lower branches and a high tree diameter. Their nests are invariably located deep within the forest. Nests are often re-used in subsequent years. Papuan eagle nests are enormous, ranging up to 3 m (9.8 ft) in both height and diameter. Nests are often place over the top of epiphytes and moss. Based on the fact that not more than one nestling nor the remnants of more than one egg have ever been found in a Papuan eagle nest, it is assumed that they lay only a single egg but other details of the egg-laying, incubation, nestling and fledgling process in this species are not known to date. Furthermore, some evidence suggests that they may only be able to breed every other year.

== Status ==
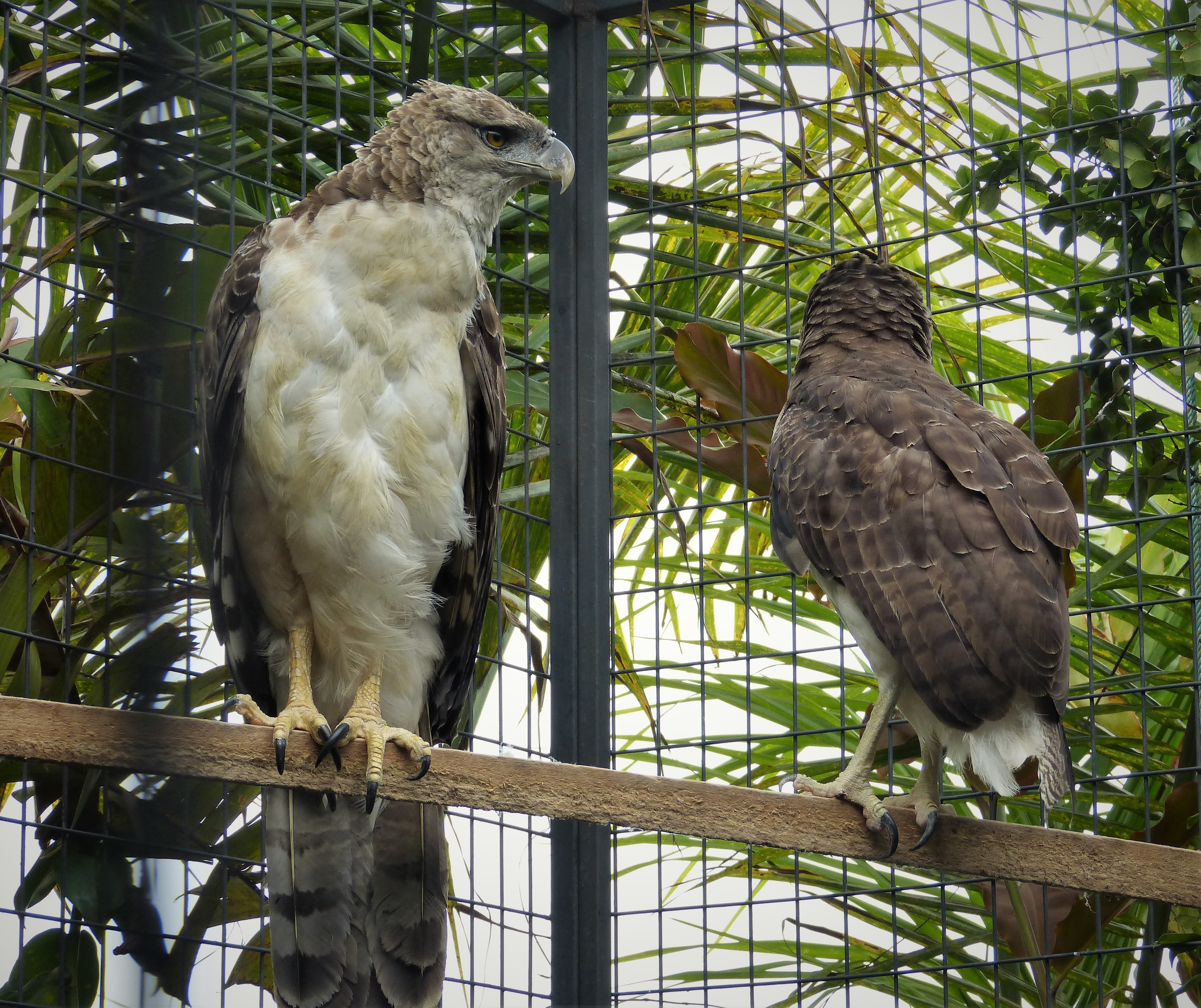
A caged pair of Papuan eagles seen in Papua New Guinea

While there have probably never been high densities of the Papuan eagle, evidence indicates that they are declining rapidly. Two different estimates posited similar total numbers, which put the number of Papuan eagles at between 1,500 and 15,000 individuals, but it is not known if this describes all individuals or merely just the breeding population, but it is certain to be a very rough estimate. It is possible that the entire population is considerably under 10,000 individuals. A number of well-known threats (most shared by similar raptor species) are known, particularly deforestation. There is no evidence that the Papuan eagle is adaptable to opening of forests and the eagles appear to abandon areas especially where logging roads have been cut into the forests. Some hunting occurs for this species' feathers which are used in ceremonies on occasion. These feathers were known to historically be highly prized possessions, although the Papuan eagle may also be shot or otherwise killed out of competition for bushmeat with local people. Evidence suggests that the active killing of Papuan eagles is quite ongoing well into the 21st century, and is probably entirely unsustainable given the already low population size. The Papuan eagle is evaluated as Vulnerable on the IUCN Red List of Threatened Species. It is listed on Appendix II of CITES.
