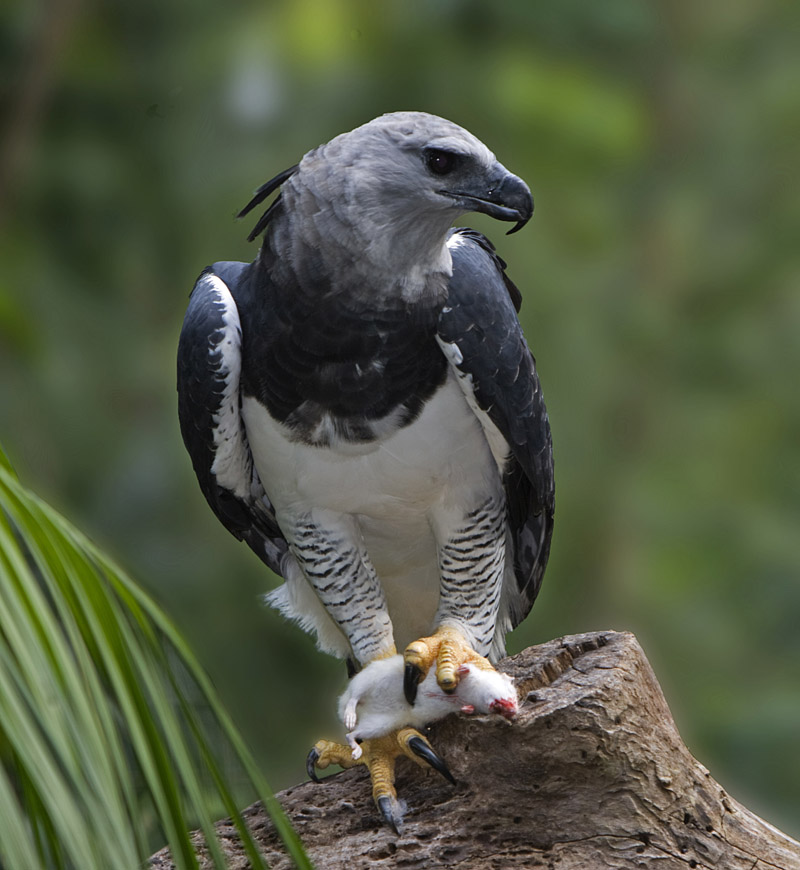
- Harpy eagle (H. harpyja)

Scientific classification
- Kingdom: Animalia
- Phylum: Chordata
- Class: Aves
- Order: Accipitriformes
- Family: Accipitridae
- Subfamily: Harpiinae; Verheyen, 1959

= Harpiinae =

Subfamily of birds

The Harpiinae is a bird of prey subfamily which consists of large broad-winged species native to tropical forests, sometimes collectively known as harpies (not to be confused with the mythological creature of the same name). There are 4 genera in the subfamily, all monotypic.

The cladogram of the Harpiinae shown below is based on a molecular phylogenetic study of the Accipitridae by Therese Catanach and collaborators that was published in 2024.

- Harpiinae
  - Harpyopsis – Papuan eagle
  - - Macheiramphus – bat hawk
    - - Morphnus – crested eagle
      - Harpia – harpy eagle

== Species ==
| Image | Genus | Species |
|---|---|---|
| | Harpyopsis Salvadori, 1875 | Papuan eagle, H. novaeguineae |
| | Macheiramphus Bonaparte, 1850 | Bat hawk, M. alcinus |
| | Morphnus Dumont, 1816 | Crested eagle, M. guianensis |
| | Harpia Vieillot, 1816 | Harpy eagle, H. harpyja |
