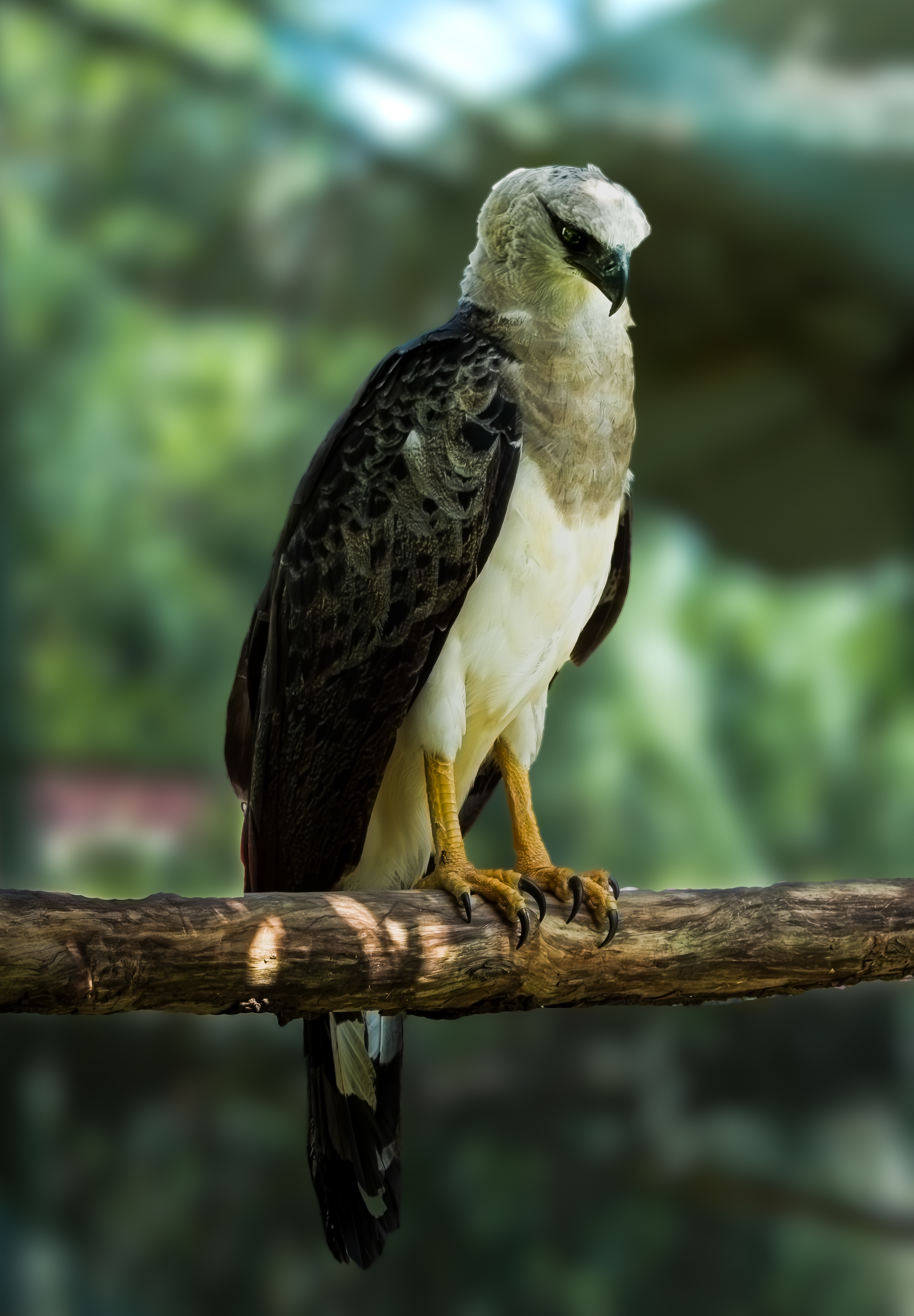
- Light morph, in captivity
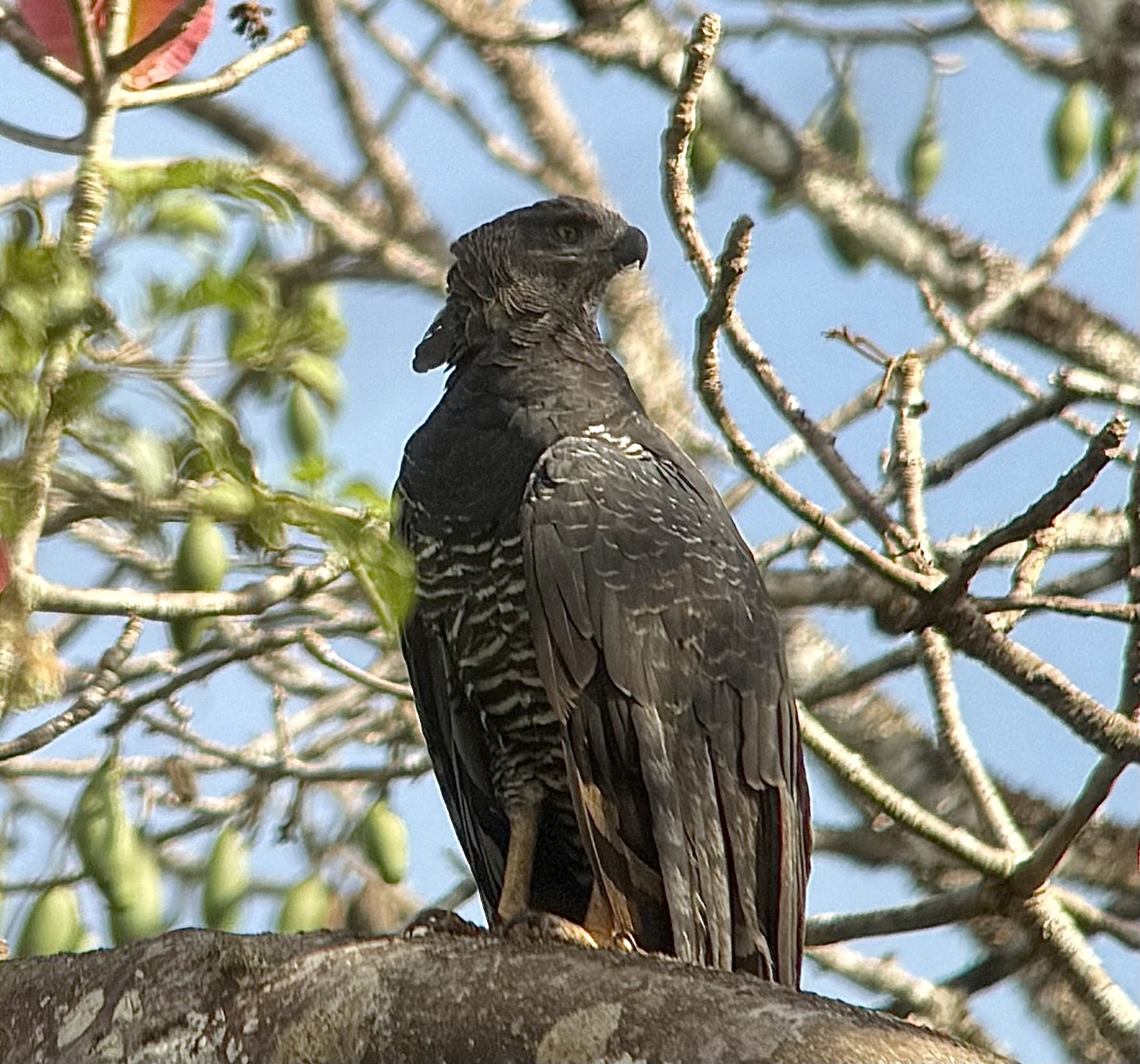
- Dark morph, in Panama

Conservation status
- Near Threatened (IUCN 3.1)

Scientific classification
- Kingdom: Animalia
- Phylum: Chordata
- Class: Aves
- Order: Accipitriformes
- Family: Accipitridae
- Subfamily: Harpiinae
- Genus: Morphnus; Dumont, 1816
- Species: M. guianensis

Binomial name
- Morphnus guianensis (Daudin, 1800)

= Crested eagle =

Species of bird

The crested eagle (Morphnus guianensis) is a large neotropical eagle, the only member of the genus Morphnus. The crested eagle can grow up to 89 cm (35 in) long, with a wingspan up to 176 cm (69 in), and weigh up to 3 kg (6.6 lb). The plumage varies between a light brownish-gray to sooty gray or even blackish in some cases. It has a white throat and a dark spot on the crest and a small dark mask across the eyes. It ranges extensively throughout Central and South America, but not in large numbers, favoring tropical lowland forest. A powerful predator, its diet consist mainly of small mammals, rodents, snakes and smaller birds. Despite their large distribution, they are currently classified as Near Threatened by the International Union for Conservation of Nature, due mainly to habitat loss

== Distribution ==
It is sparsely distributed throughout its extensive range from northern Guatemala through Belize, Honduras, Nicaragua, Costa Rica, Panama, the subtropical Andes of Colombia, northeastern Venezuela, Guyana, Suriname, French Guiana, Brazil (where it has suffered greatly from habitat destruction, being now found practically only in the Amazonian basin), and east Andean Ecuador, southeastern Peru, Paraguay and eastern Bolivia to north Argentina.

== Habitat ==
The crested eagle lives in humid lowland forests, mostly comprised by old growth tropical rainforests. They can also range in gallery strips and forest ravines. Over most of the range, sightings are from sea level to 600 m (2,000 ft). However, in the Andean countries they appear to be local residents in foothill forests up to 1,000 m (3,300 ft) elevation or even 1,600 m (5,200 ft). They may show some predilection to be near water, including coasts or rivers.

== Description ==
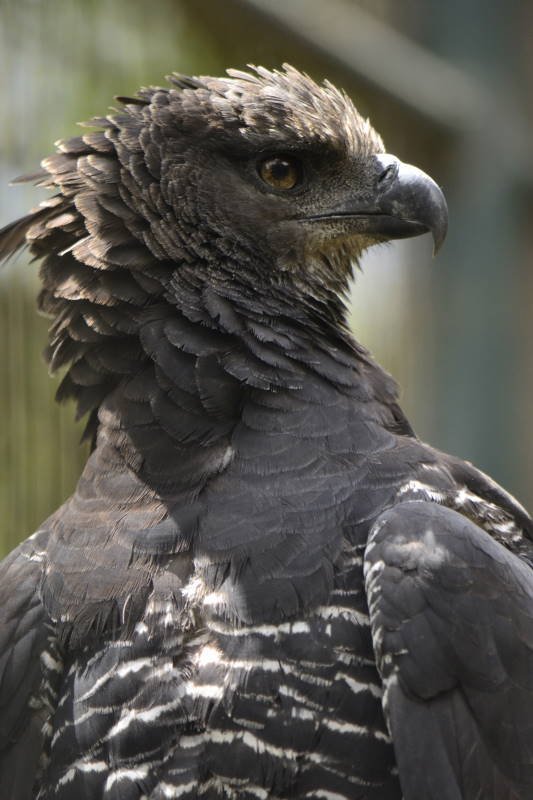
Dark morph close up, in captivity

The species is a large but slender eagle. It measures 71 to 89 cm (28 to 35 in) long and has a wingspan of 138 to 176 cm (4 ft 6 in to 5 ft 9 in). Weights range from 1.2 to 3 kg (2.6 to 6.6 lb). The average weight of crested eagles in Tikal, Guatemala was reported as 1.75 kg (3.9 lb), with a male reported to weigh 1.27 kg (2.8 lb) and a handful of females 1.85 to 1.98 kg (4.1 to 4.4 lb). Standard measurements have indicated females are about 14% larger on average than males.

The crested eagle has a large head, an effect enhanced by the often extended feather crest of its name. It has bare legs with a sizable tarsus length of 10.3 to 11.2 cm (4.1 to 4.4 in). The tail is fairly long, measuring 34 to 43 cm (13 to 17 in), in part accounting for the considerably low weights cited for an eagle of its size. The wings are quite short for the eagle's size but are broad and rounded. Forest-dwelling raptors often have a relatively small wingspan in order to enable movement within the dense, twisted forest environments. The wing chord measures 42.5–48.5 cm (16.7–19.1 in).

The plumage is somewhat variable. The head, back and chest of most adults are light brownish-gray, with a white throat and a dark spot on the crest and a small dark mask across the eyes. There are also various dark morphs where the plumage is sooty-gray or just blackish in some cases. The juvenile is white on the head and chest, with a marbled-gray coloration on the back and wings. They turn to a sandy-gray color in the second year of life. Dark morph juveniles are similar but are dark brownish-gray from an early age. In flight, crested eagles are all pale below except for the grayish coloration on the chest.

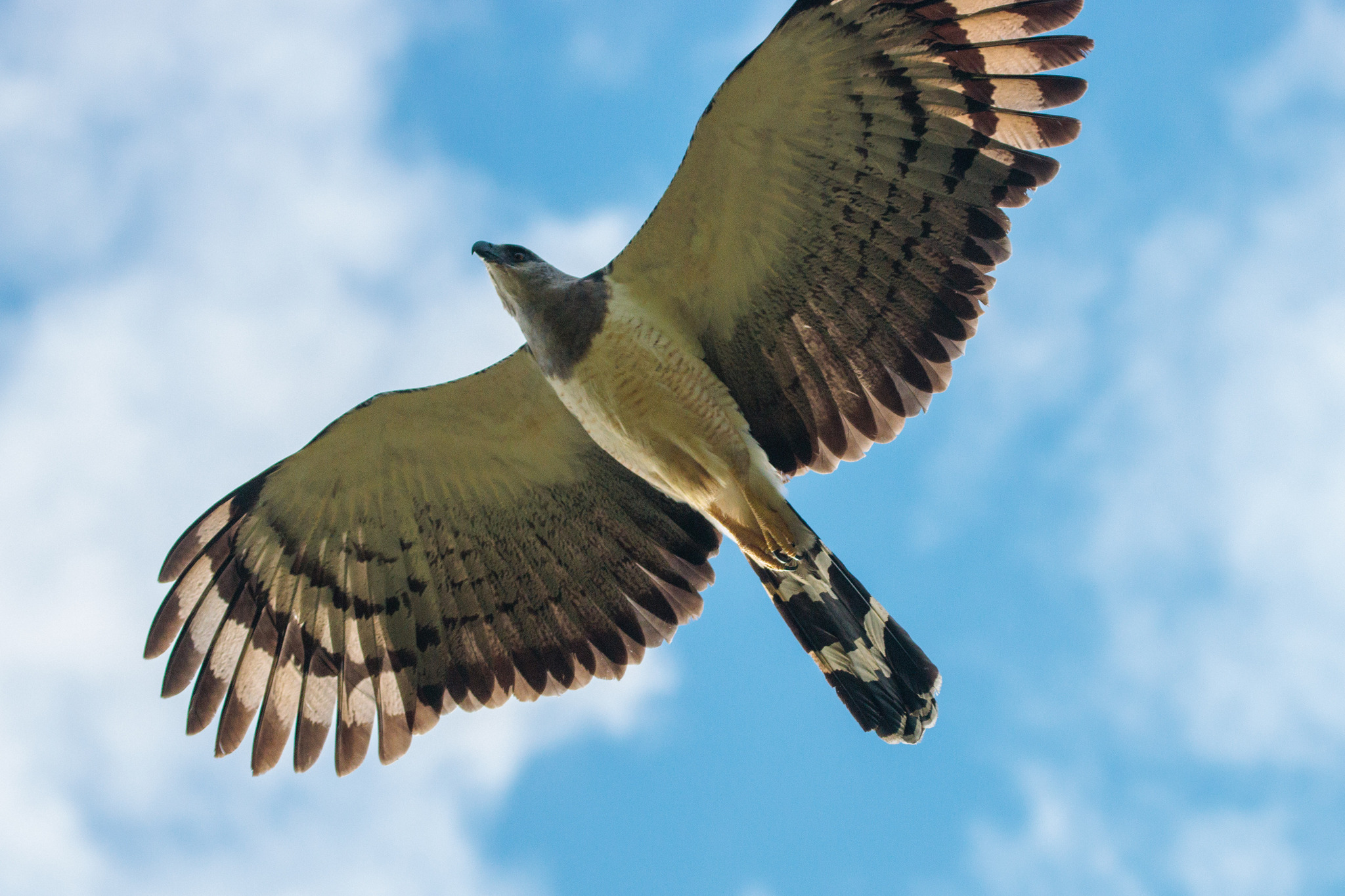
Light morph in flight, in Brazil

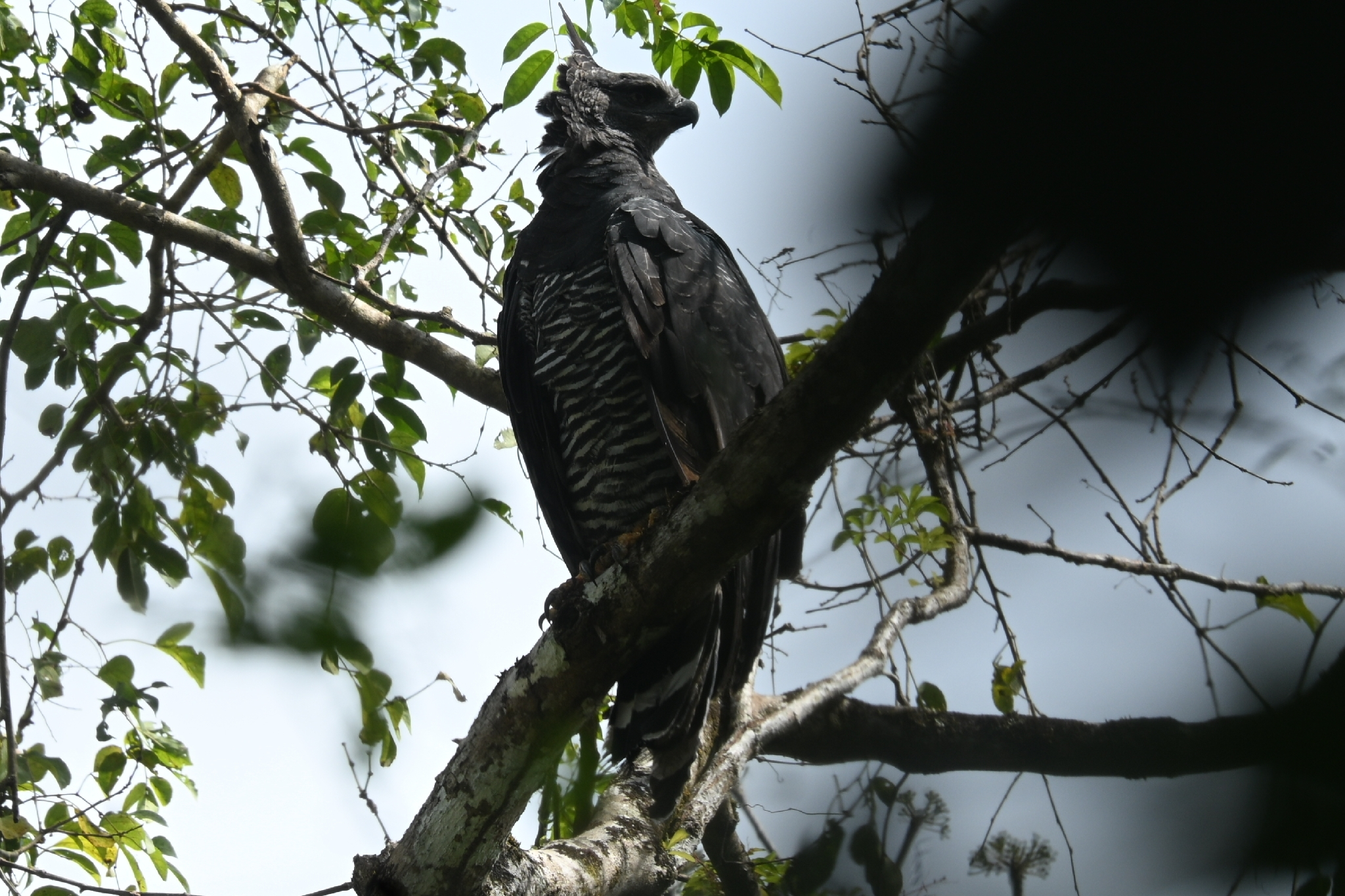
Dark morph, in Panama

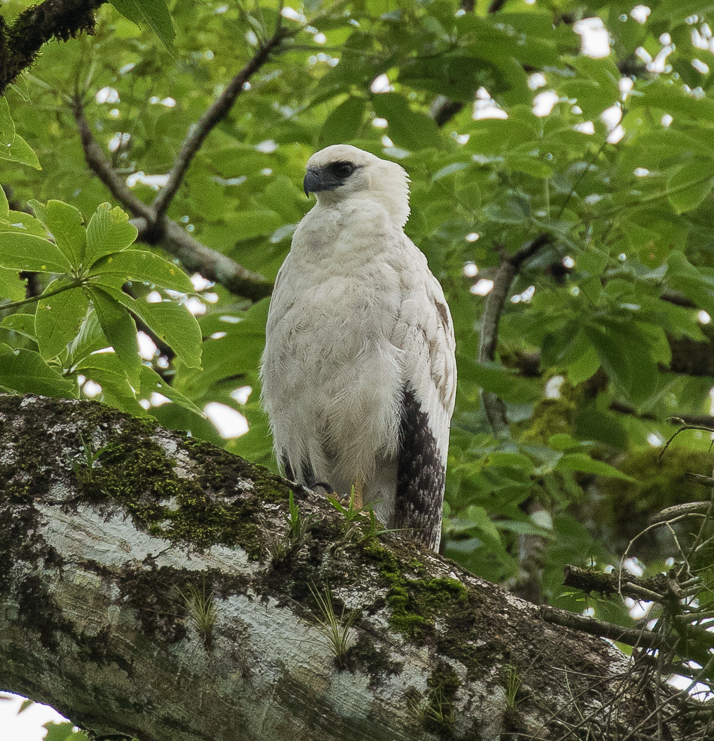
Juvenile in Darién, Panama

This species often overlaps in range with the less scarce harpy eagle, which is likely its close relative and is somewhat similar in appearance. There is evidence of an interesting interspecific relationship between an adult crested eagle feeding a juvenile Harpy eagle in Panama, while the adult Harpy eagles were away. During these interactions, the crested eagle brought new nesting material to the nest and in occasions brought food to the juvenile Harpy eagle.

== Ecology ==
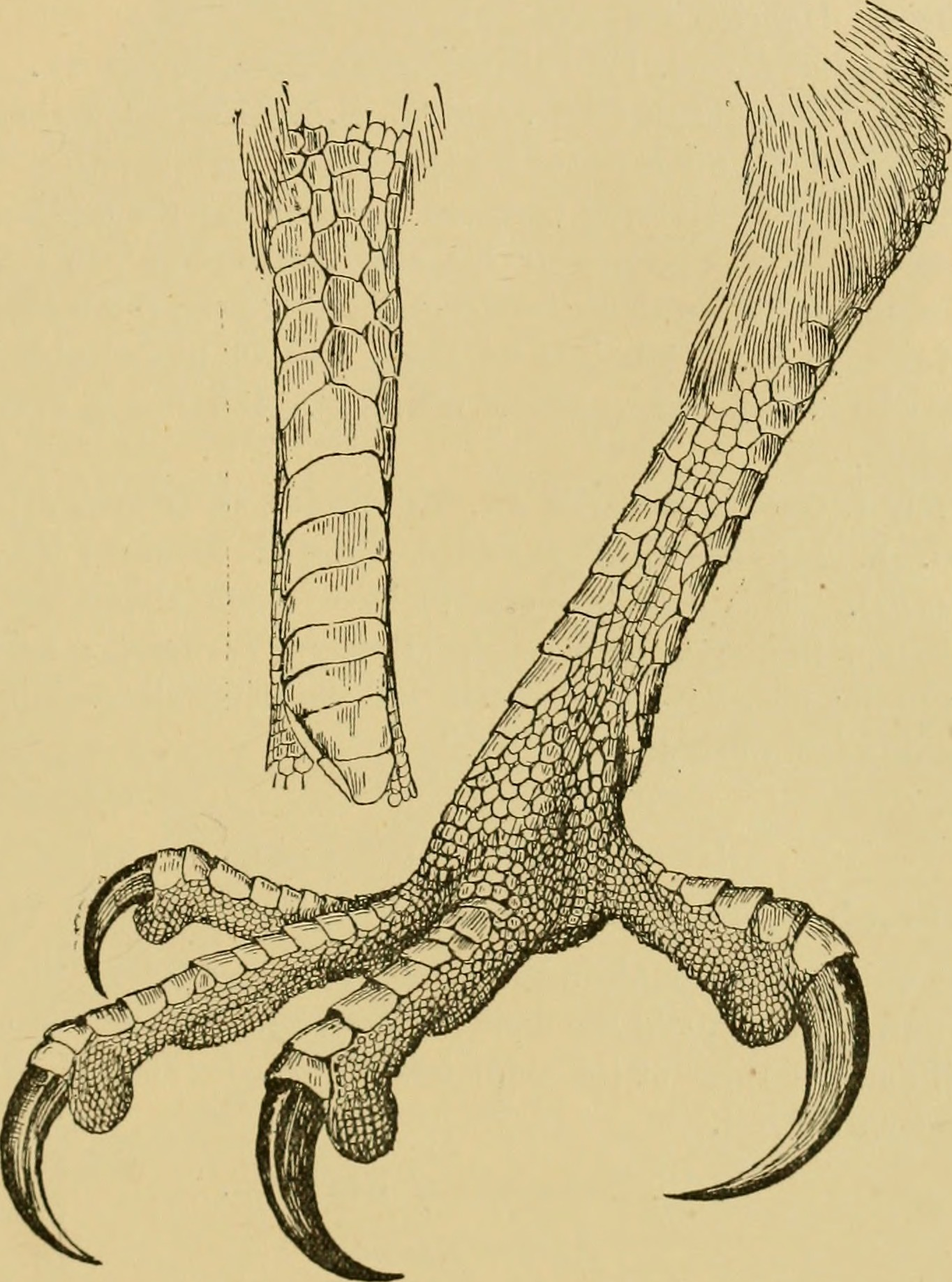
Illustration of the foot and talons of a crested eagle.

=== Diet and feeding ===
The crested eagle seems to be a still-hunter, as it has been observed perched for long periods of time while visual scanning the forest around them. The crested eagle may avoid direct competition with the harpy eagle by taking generally smaller prey. However, the crested eagle is certainly a powerful avian predator in its own right, and most studies have indicated they are primarily a predator of small mammals. Often reflected in the diet are small monkeys, such as capuchin monkeys, tamarins, and woolly monkeys. Data from the Atlantic Forest of Brazil indicates that small-to-mid-sized monkeys appear to be focused on, either adults of small monkeys like squirrel monkeys and tamarins or small and young specimens of larger species like white-faced sakis and red-faced spider monkeys, with the monkeys attacked estimated to usually weigh from 0.3 to 3 kg (0.66 to 6.61 lb). Other mammalian prey may include numerous arboreal rodents as well as opossums, sloths and kinkajous.

Studies indicate that the crested eagle is specialized to hunt the small to mid-sized monkeys relative to other forest raptors, but the crested eagle prefers to attack the young of even smaller monkey species such as tamarins. In Tikal, the primary prey appeared to be opossums, from tiny mouse opossums to mid-sized Didelphis species, and the largely nocturnally-active prey of crested eagles indicated a deeply searching hunting technique, which overlapped with the black hawk-eagle in the region but not with the region's ornate hawk-eagle, which, in spite of its smaller size, tended to take larger prey and be more opportunistic as well as having a stronger predilection for bird-hunting. Findings of primary prey in the Brazilian Amazon rainforest were almost the same with a preference for small opossums and nocturnal animals (at about 70% of the diet) with about 69% of the diet being mammalian, followed by reptiles and birds.

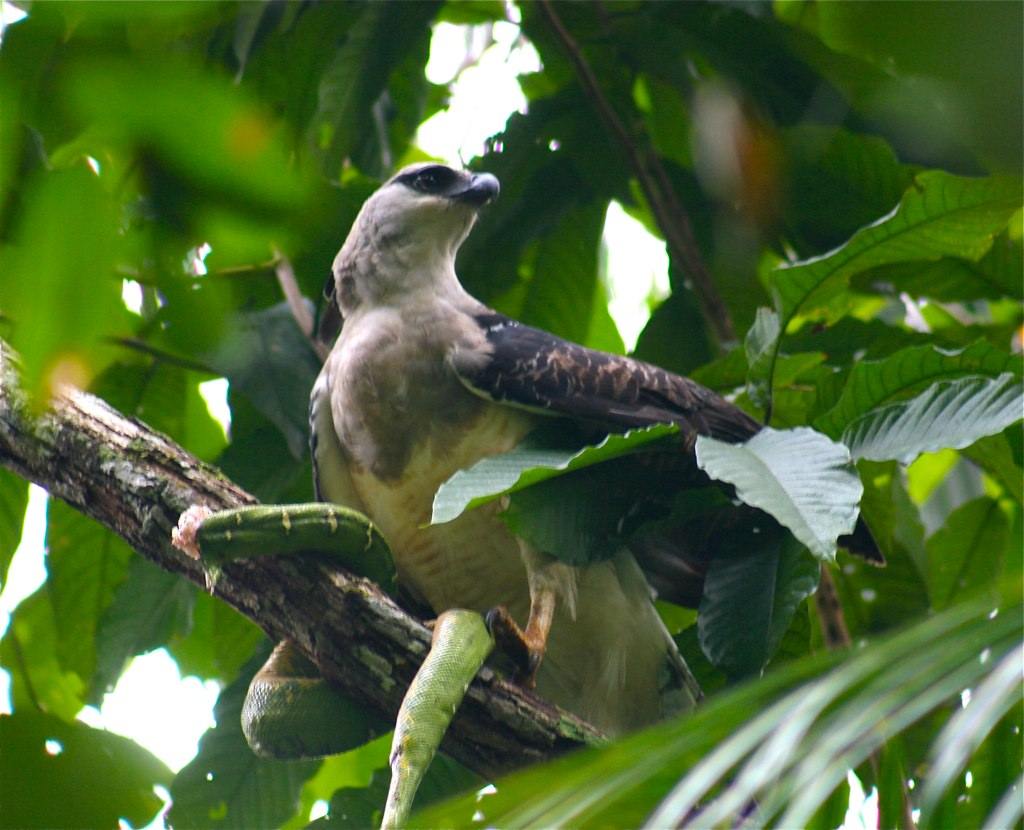
Light morph feeding on an Amazon Basin emerald tree boa, in Bolivia

Various studies have pointed to the abundance of snakes (both arboreal and terrestrial varieties with several instances of predation on boas reported) and other reptiles (principally lizards including iguanas) in its prey base, but the relative frequency of different types of prey apparently varies greatly on the individual level and reptiles appear to take a secondary position to mammals. It will also predate on tree frogs. Birds may comprise a larger portion of the diet for crested than they do for harpy eagles. Birds such as jays, trumpeters and guans have been observed to be predated at fruiting trees and male cocks-of-the-rock have been predated while conspicuously performing at their leks. However, dietary studies have indicated birds are even more minor in dietary significance than reptiles. Incidents of crested eagles inspecting harpy eagle nests have been reported and, impressively, an incidence of a crested eagle killing a post-fledging young harpy eagle have been reported.

=== Reproduction ===
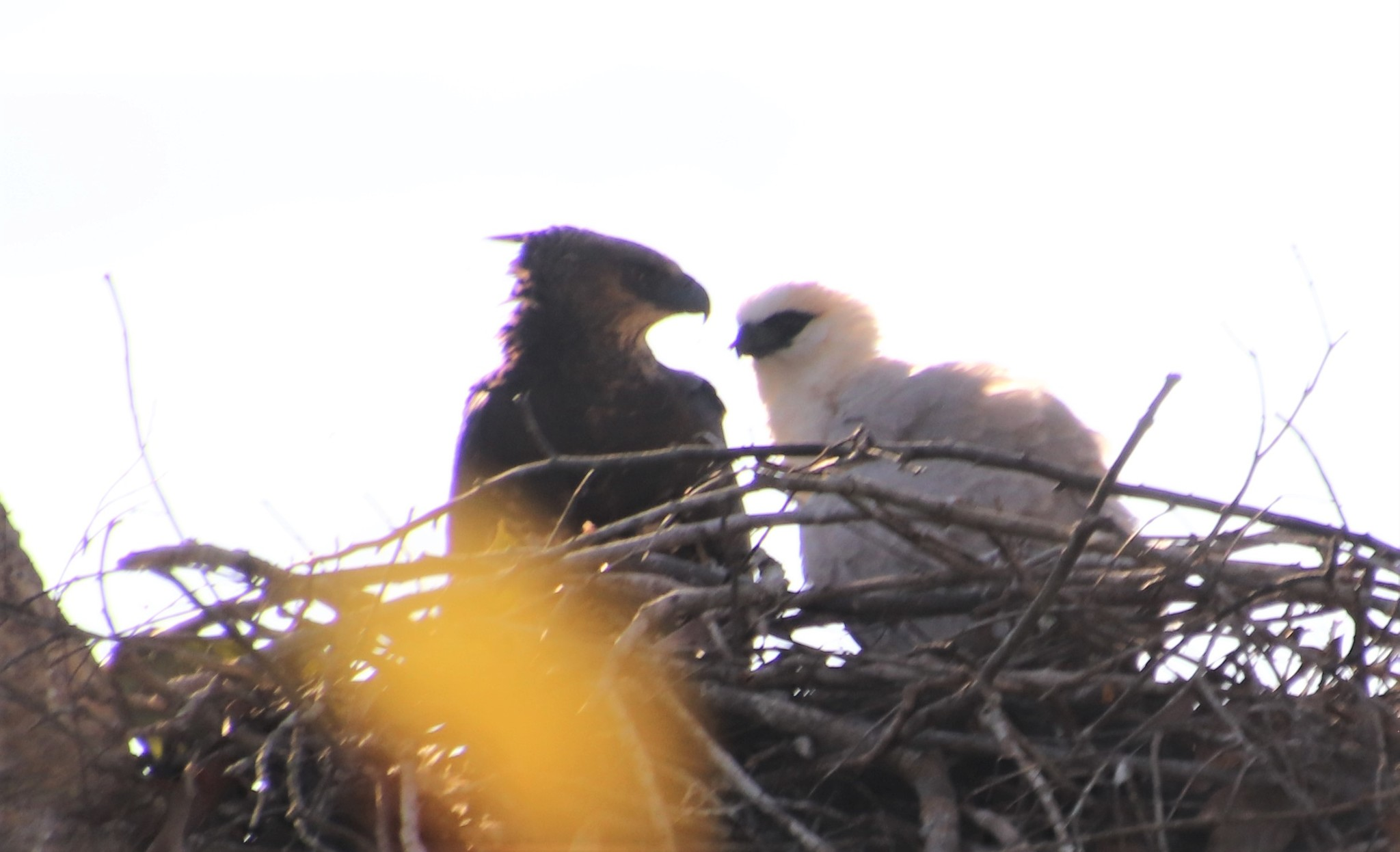
Adult with juvenile in nest, in Brazil

The crested eagle is almost always observed singly or in pairs, being solitary like most raptors. The breeding season is from March–April (the borderline between the dry season and the wet season in the neotropics) onwards. Nests are typically in the main fork of a large, emergent forest tree. The nest is often huge but has a relatively shallow cup and is often concealed near the canopy in greenery.

The clutch size appears to be typically two but only one eaglet has ever been known to hatch from crested eagle nests. The eggs are dull white ovals. One egg of the species was found to measure 64 mm × 50.7 mm (2.52 in × 2.00 in) and to weigh 90.5 g (3.19 oz). Growth rates appear to be typical for a forest eagle, with initial wing quills emerging at about 21 days, primary feathers emerging from their sheaths at about 4 weeks and fledgling occurs at about 100 to 110 days.

Female crested eagles are said to be diligent about sitting and feeding the chicks, also shielding the chick from harsh sun or from rain, while the male of the species primarily delivers food, announcing his presence with a loud call. Even after fledgling, the young crested eagle is still known to be fully reliant on its parents, and evidence indicates it may take from 16 even up to perhaps 30 months before the eagle is fully independent, indicating that they can typically breed only every other year. Breeding every other year is typical in tropical, especially forest-dwelling, eagles.

== Status ==
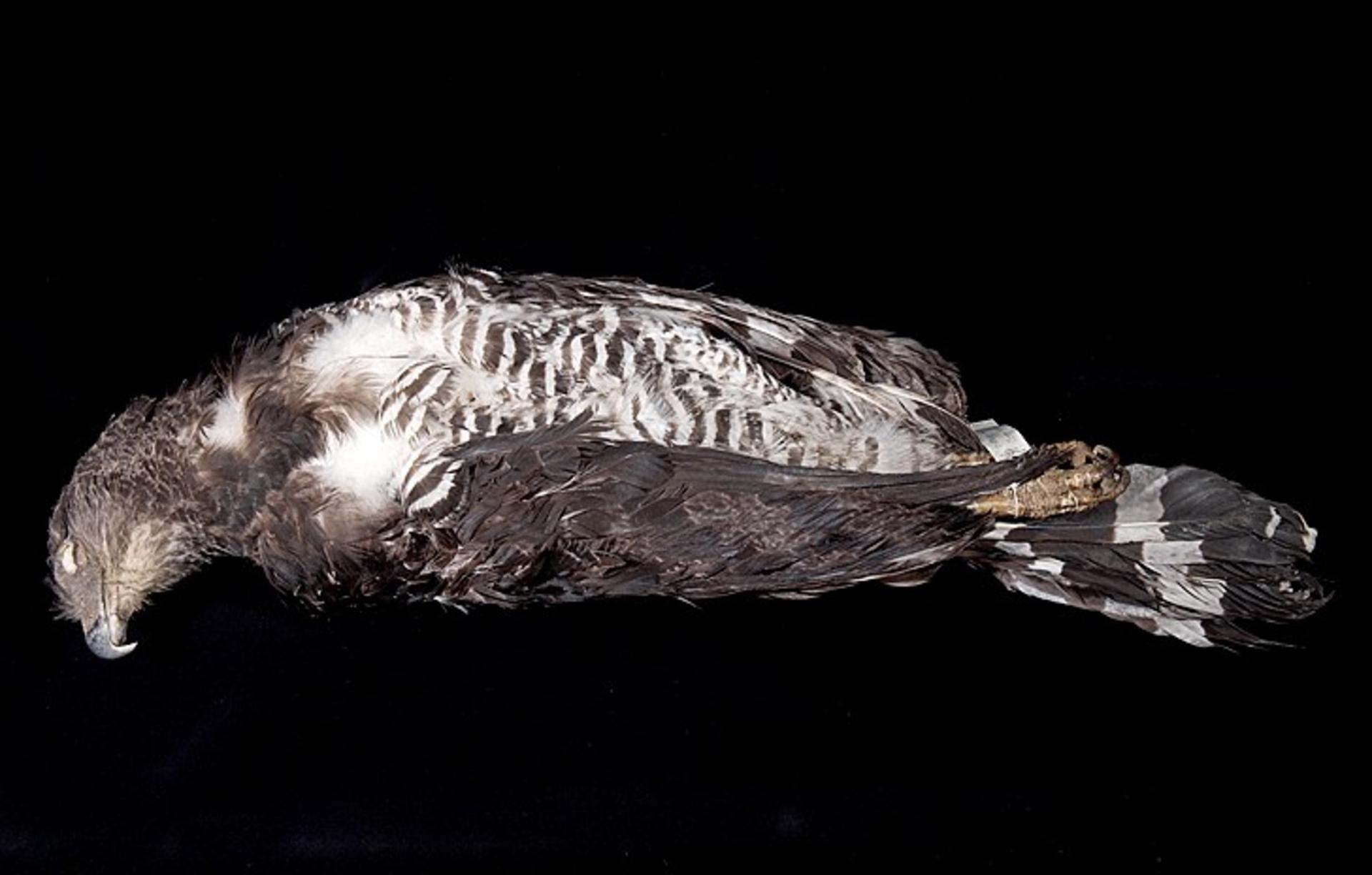
A museum specimen showing a darker hue.

The crested eagle has always seemed to occur at low densities and may occasionally elude detection in areas where they do occur. Though they still have a large distribution, they are currently classified as Near Threatened by the IUCN. The total population of breeding adults is estimated between 1,000 and 10,000 individuals.

Because of their seemingly high dependence on sprawling forest, they are highly affected by habitat destruction. Tropical forests such as the Amazon are so heavily degraded and logged that they are thought to be unable to sustainably support most forest-dwelling raptors native to them. The crested eagle is believed to no longer occur in several former breeding areas where extensive forest has been cleared.

It is thought that they are occasionally hunted by local people and in some cases are shot on sight. If discovered while perched, they are relatively easy to shoot, since they usually perch for extended periods of time. In Mexico, the species is thought to have been at least halved in population, largely via habitat loss. Data indicates that the species is declining essentially throughout its entire range.
