= Honey Buzzard =

Honey Buzzard may refer to:

- Pernis (bird), a genus of raptors, consisting of:
  - European honey buzzard (Pernis apivorus), a summer migrant to most of Europe and western Asia, wintering in tropical Africa
  - Crested honey buzzard (Pernis ptilorhynchus), also known as the Oriental honey buzzard, a summer migrant to Siberia, wintering in tropical south east Asia
  - Barred honey buzzard (Pernis celebensis), found in Indonesia and the Philippines
- Henicopernis, a genus of raptors, consisting of:
  - Black honey buzzard (Henicopernis infuscatus), endemic to Papua New Guinea
  - Long-tailed honey buzzard (Henicopernis longicauda), found in Indonesia and Papua New Guinea
- The Honey Buzzards, a rock band from Norwich, England
- Honeybuzzard, US title of a novel by Angela Carter
