= Black honey buzzard =

Conservation status
- Vulnerable (IUCN 3.1)

Scientific classification
- Kingdom: Animalia
- Phylum: Chordata
- Class: Aves
- Order: Accipitriformes
- Family: Accipitridae
- Genus: Henicopernis
- Species: H. infuscatus

Binomial name
- Henicopernis infuscatus Gurney, JH Sr, 1882

Species of bird

The black honey buzzard (Henicopernis infuscatus), also known as the New Britain honey buzzard, is a large raptor of the family Accipitridae. Standing at around 50 cm (20 in) tall, the adult black honey buzzard has a dark head and body, with striking white bands on its tail and flight feathers. When in flight, the buzzard can be recognized by its long wings and noticeably large secondary feathers. It is thought to be sedentary, with a range limited to the island of New Britain in Papua New Guinea, where it is endemic. Due to its remote habitat and tendency to remain in densely forested areas, there is still much to learn about this species.

== Description ==
The black honey buzzard is a dark grey-brown colour with pale silvery bars on the wings and tail. When perched, the wing and tail bars are clearly visible. In flight, the wing bars are notable and the wing shape is distinctive, with a narrow base and broad tips, and bulging outer primaries. Juvenile markings are unknown. Its height ranges 48–52 cm (19–20 in), and wingspan ranges 110–115 cm (43–45 in).

It was first identified and catalogued among European natural historians by James Sligo Jameson in 1877.

== Taxonomy ==
The black honey buzzard belongs within the subfamily Perninae, in the family Accipitridae. The family Acipitridae contains two subfamilies of kites: Elaninae and Perninae. Birds within Perninae lack the bony eye shield that characterizes those in Elaninae, and are mainly found in the tropics where they are specialized to feed on insects, bee and wasp larvae.

The genus Henicopernis contains only two species: The black honey buzzard and the long-tailed honey buzzard (Henicopernis longicauda). The Australo-Papuan region, which encompasses Australia and Papua New Guinea, has many endemic species since the region was isolated from other land masses for millions of years. These include three closely related genera of the family Accipitridae: Henicopernis, Hamirostra and Lophoictinia.

== Habitat and distribution ==
The black honey buzzard occurs on the island of New Britain, part of the Bismarck archipelago in Papua New Guinea. Its habitat consists of primary rainforest, usually in hilly areas. Its altitudinal range extends up to 1,300 m (4,300 ft). The population is estimated to be between 6000 and 15 000 mature individuals.

== Behaviour ==
=== Vocalizations ===
Its vocalizations consist of 12 piping notes, accelerating and shortening over about three seconds.

=== Diet ===
The diet is largely unknown, but it is assumed that it is similar to that of the long-tailed honey buzzard, which typically feeds on arthropods, lizards, birds and birds' eggs.

=== Reproduction ===
The black honey buzzard is unobtrusive, and is seldom sighted due to its shy nature. Although the generation length has not been studied directly, it is estimated to be approximately 10 years, based on that of two similar-sized raptors: The square-tailed kite (Lophoictinia isura) and the red goshawk (Erythrotriorchis radiatus).

== Status and conservation ==
The black honey buzzard is highly dependent on primary forest, where it nests and feeds. This species is estimated to have lost 12.5% of the primary forest within its range between the years 1990 and 2000. The island of New Britain has experienced considerable deforestation due to logging, as well as land use change as forested areas are converted to small-scale agricultural operations and oil palm plantations. In 2004, West New Britain province accounted for over 50% of Papua New Guinea's timber exports. However, a great deal of the species' range is on steep and montane areas which are not suitable for logging or oil palm production.

The black honey buzzard is classified as vulnerable according to the IUCN Red List of Threatened Species. This classification is primarily due to the continuing decline the area of available habitat.
