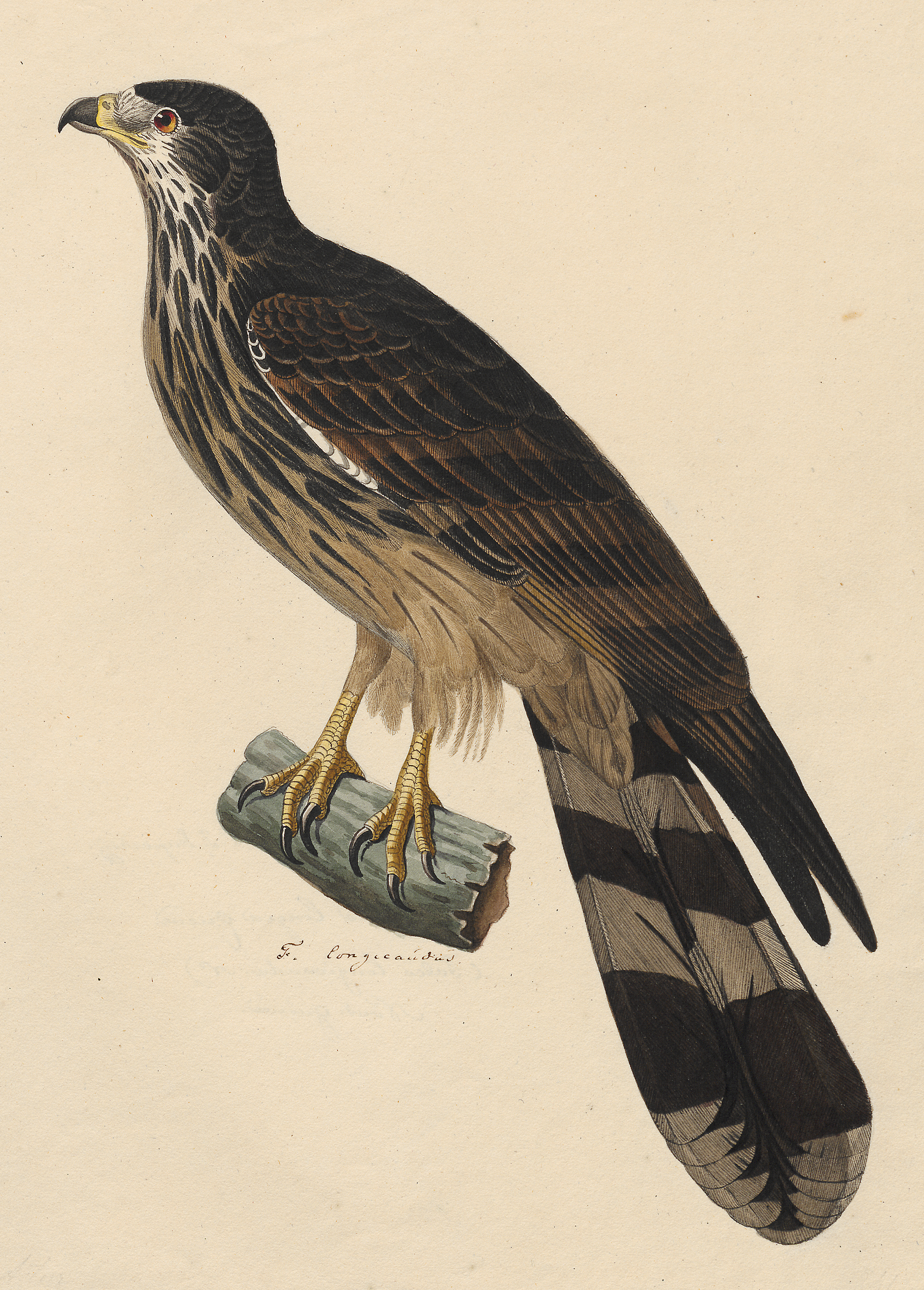
- Long-tailed Honey Buzzard (Henicopernis longicauda)

Scientific classification
- Kingdom: Animalia
- Phylum: Chordata
- Class: Aves
- Order: Accipitriformes
- Family: Accipitridae
- Subfamily: Perninae
- Genus: Henicopernis; G.R. Gray, 1859

Type species
- Falco longicauda Lesson & Garnot, 1828

= Henicopernis =

Genus of birds

Henicopernis is a genus of bird of prey in the family Accipitridae.

== Species ==
It contains the following species:

Image	Common name	Scientific name	Distribution
	Black honey buzzard	Henicopernis infuscatus	the Bismarck archipelago in Papua New Guinea.
	Long-tailed honey buzzard	Henicopernis longicauda	New Guinea

Both species are endemic to New Guinea. Genetic research has found that they are closely related to the Australian endemic square-tailed kite (Lophoictinia isura) and black-breasted buzzard (Hamirostra melanosternon), all sharing a 3-base-pair deletion in the RAG-1 gene. The four species form a monophyletic clade sister to Aviceda within the subfamily Perninae. It has been proposed that they could be united into a single genus, Hamirostra having precedence.
