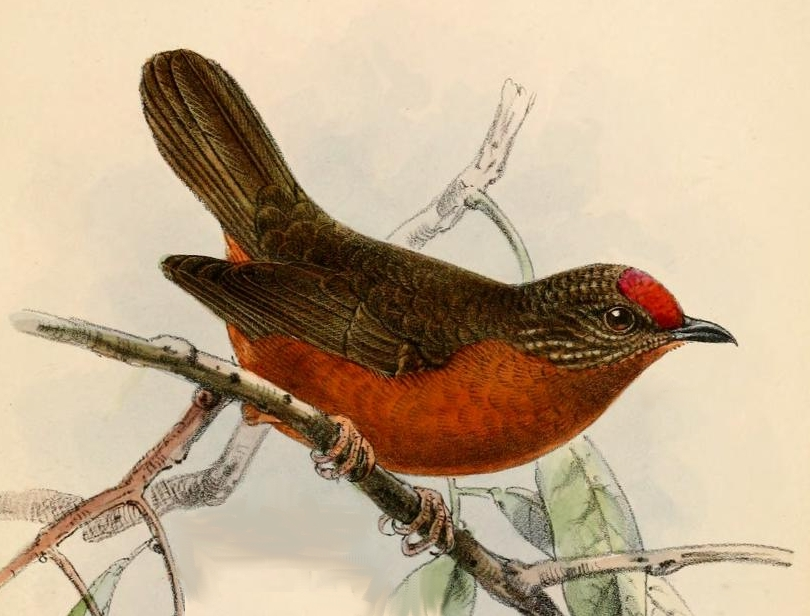

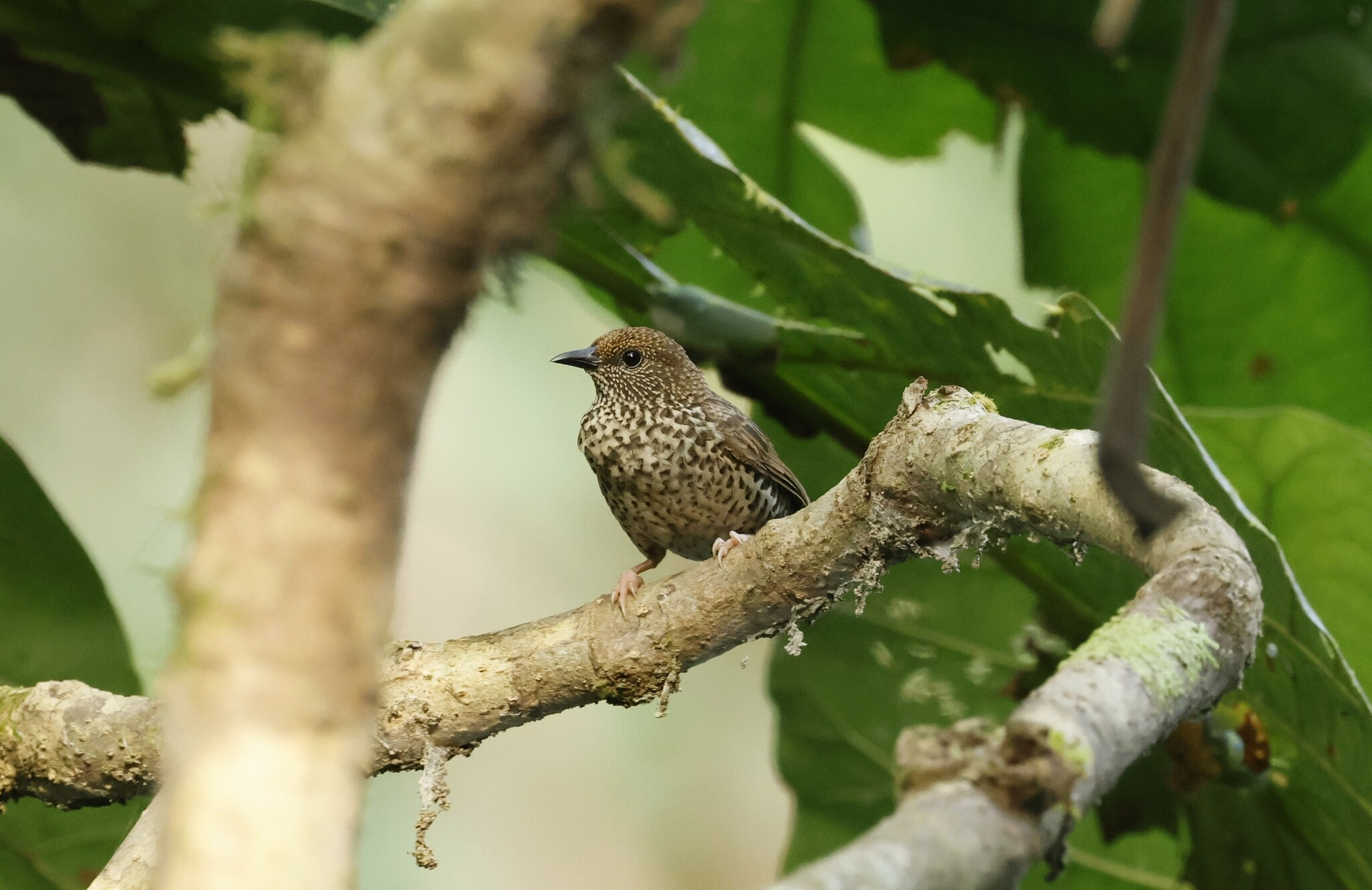

Conservation status
- Near Threatened (IUCN 3.1)

Scientific classification
- Kingdom: Animalia
- Phylum: Chordata
- Class: Aves
- Order: Passeriformes
- Family: Estrildidae
- Genus: Parmoptila
- Species: P. rubrifrons

Binomial name
- Parmoptila rubrifrons (Sharpe & Ussher, 1872)
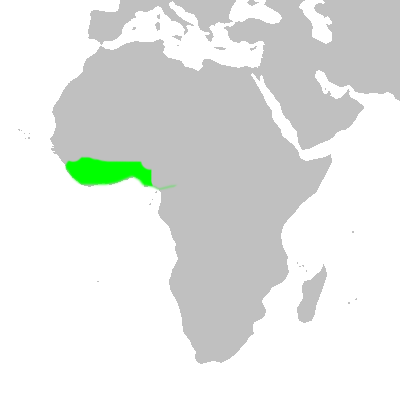
- Range

= Red-fronted antpecker =

Species of bird

The red-fronted antpecker (Parmoptila rubrifrons) is a species of songbird found in Western Africa. Like all antpeckers, it is placed in the estrildid finch family, Estrildidae. Jameson's antpecker (P. jamesoni) has sometimes been considered as a subspecies.

== Taxonomy ==
The red-fronted antpecker was formally described in 1872 by the English ornithologist Richard Bowdler Sharpe and the colonial administrator Herbert Taylor Ussher based on specimens procured in the Fante region of southern Ghana. They coined the binomial name Pholidornis rubrifrons where the specific epithet combines the Latin ruber meaning "red" with frons, frontis meaning "forehead" or "brow". The red-fronted antpecker is now placed with Woodhouse's antpecker and Jameson's antpecker in the genus Parmoptila that was introduced in 1859 by the American ornithologist John Cassin. The species is monotypic: no subspecies are recognised.

== Distribution and habitat ==
The red-fronted antpecker inhabits tropical lowland moist forest in Sierra Leone, Liberia, Guinea, Ghana and Côte d'Ivoire. When Jameson's and the red-fronted antpeckers were still evaluated as one species, they were classified as a species of least concern by the IUCN. However, the red-fronted antpecker is declining noticeably due to habitat destruction and has entirely disappeared from Mali for example. Therefore, its status has been changed to near threatened after the taxonomic split.
