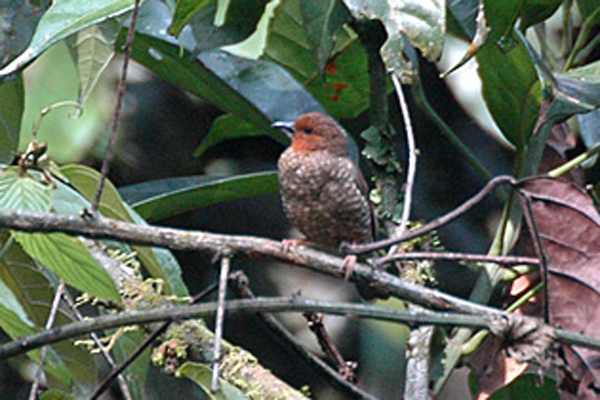
- Female Jameson's antpecker (Parmoptila jamesoni)

Scientific classification
- Kingdom: Animalia
- Phylum: Chordata
- Class: Aves
- Order: Passeriformes
- Family: Estrildidae
- Genus: Parmoptila; Cassin, 1859

Type species
- Parmoptila woodhousei Cassin, 1859

Species
- Parmoptila jamesoni Parmoptila rubrifrons Parmoptila woodhousei

= Antpecker =

Antpeckers

Genus of birds

The antpeckers are a genus Parmoptila of small seed-eating birds in the family Estrildidae. They range across the tropical forests of western and central Africa.

== Taxonomy ==
The genus Parmoptila was introduced in 1859 by the American ornithologist John Cassin to accommodate Woodhouse's antpecker. The genus name combines the Ancient Greek parmē, the word for a small round shield, and ptilon meaning "feather".

=== Species ===
The genus contains the following three species:

Image	Common name	Scientific name	Distribution
	Red-fronted antpecker	Parmoptila rubrifrons	Upper Guinean forests
	Jameson's antpecker	Parmoptila jamesoni	Congolian rainforest
	Woodhouse's antpecker	Parmoptila woodhousei	Congolian rainforest
