= James Sligo Jameson =

Scottish naturalist and African traveller (1856–1888)

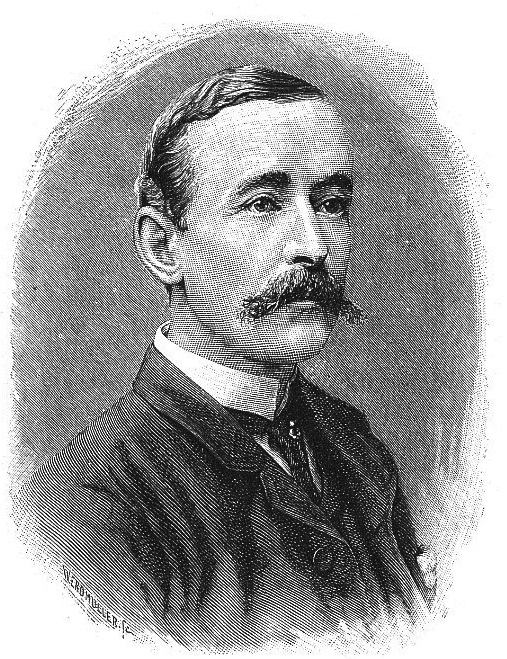
- Born: 17 August 1856; Alloa, Clackmannanshire, Scotland
- Died: 17 August 1888 (aged 32); Bangala Station, Congo Free State
- Occupation: Naturalist

James Sligo Jameson (17 August 1856 – 17 August 1888) was a Scottish naturalist and traveller in Africa. He identified the black honey-buzzard in 1877. Jameson's antpecker, Jameson's firefinch, and Jameson's wattle-eye are named after him. However, he is most remembered for his role in causing a young slave girl to be killed and eaten by cannibals.

A grandson of the founder of Jameson Irish Whiskey, Jameson was in his early twenties when he started to devote himself to travel. He went to Borneo by way of Ceylon, hunted in Southern Africa and the Rocky Mountains, and visited Spain and Algeria before getting married in 1885.

Two years later, he decided to join the Emin Pasha Relief Expedition led by Henry Morton Stanley. In August 1888, while still deep in the Congo Basin, he died of a severe fever, a few months after allegedly paying associates of the slave trader Tippu Tip to procure a ten-year-old enslaved girl who was then slaughtered and cooked in front of them. In his diary, Jameson admitted that he paid the charged price, saw the event, and made sketches of it, but claimed that he had considered the whole affair a joke and had not expected her to be actually killed. However, two members of the expedition accused him of having deliberately instigated the murder to satisfy his curiosity about cannibalism, and his diary shows him to be well informed of cannibal customs, making his line of defence doubtful. The occurrence became known as the Jameson Affair.

The central character of Joseph Conrad's 1899 novella Heart of Darkness may have been modelled after Jameson. Some ornithologists have suggested renaming the bird species named after him because of his unethical behaviour in Africa.

== Early life ==
Jameson was born on 17 August 1856 in Alloa, Clackmannanshire. His father, Andrew Jameson of Daphne Castle in County Wexford, a land agent, was the son of John Jameson of Dublin, the Scottish founder of whiskey distillers Jameson & Sons. James's mother was Margaret, daughter of James Cochrane of Glen Lodge, Sligo. After elementary education at Scottish schools, Jameson was, in 1868, placed under Leonard Schmitz at the London International College, and subsequently read for the army, but in 1877 he decided to devote himself to travel. In that year he went by way of Ceylon and Singapore to Borneo, where he was the first to describe the black honey buzzard to Western audiences, and he returned home with a collection of birds, butterflies, and beetles.

Towards the end of 1878, he went out to South Africa in search of big game and hunted for a few weeks on the skirts of the Kalahari Desert. In the early part of 1879, he returned to Potchefstroom, whence despite the disaffection of the Boers he reached the Zambesi district of the interior, trekking along the Great Marico River and up the Limpopo. Together with H. Collison he next passed through the "Great Thirst Land" into the country of the Matabelis, whose king received them hospitably, and joined by the well-known African hunter, Frederick Selous, they pushed on into Mashonaland (today a part of Zimbabwe). They made their final halt near the Mupfure River (also known as Umfuli or Umvuli), hunted lions and rhinoceroses, and documented its junction with another river, the Munyati (then called Umnyati). In 1881 Jameson returned to England with a collection of animal heads as well as ornithological, entomological, and botanical specimens. According to Richard Bowdler Sharpe, the journey contributed "a great deal to our knowledge of the birds of South-eastern Africa."

In 1882, accompanied by his brother, he went on a shooting expedition to the Rocky Mountains, passing from the main range into Montana and thence to the North Fork of the Shoshone River. He visited Spain and Algeria in 1884, and on his return home in February 1885 he married Ethel, daughter of Henry Marion Durand. They had two daughters. Jameson's sister Annie became the mother of the Italian electrical engineer and inventor Guglielmo Marconi, creator of the practical wireless telegraph system.

== Journey to Africa ==
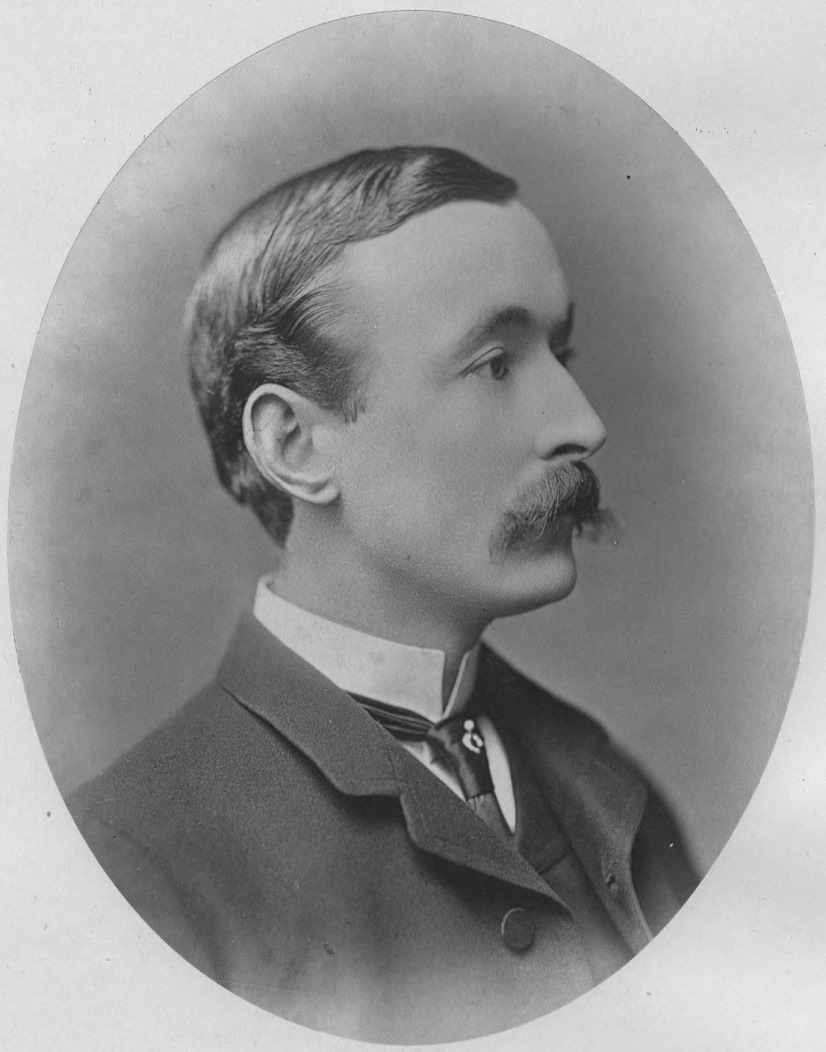
Photograph of Jameson

Jameson joined as a naturalist, by an agreement signed on 20 January 1887, the Emin Pasha Relief Expedition under the direction of Henry Morton Stanley, after agreeing to contribute 1,000 pounds to the funds. Stanley had some concerns because Jameson looked "physically frail", but was reassured by the latter's earlier travel experience. They reached Banana in March and started travelling up the Congo River from there. Jameson found Stanley to be a harsh and hard-to-satisfy leader. When Stanley once suffered from dysentery, he put the whole blame on Jameson, who was responsible for cooking and rations. As they got deeper into the Congo Basin, the expedition's physician, Thomas Heazle Parke, noticed that Jameson "was fascinated by the subject of cannibalism."

=== With the rear guard at Yambuya ===
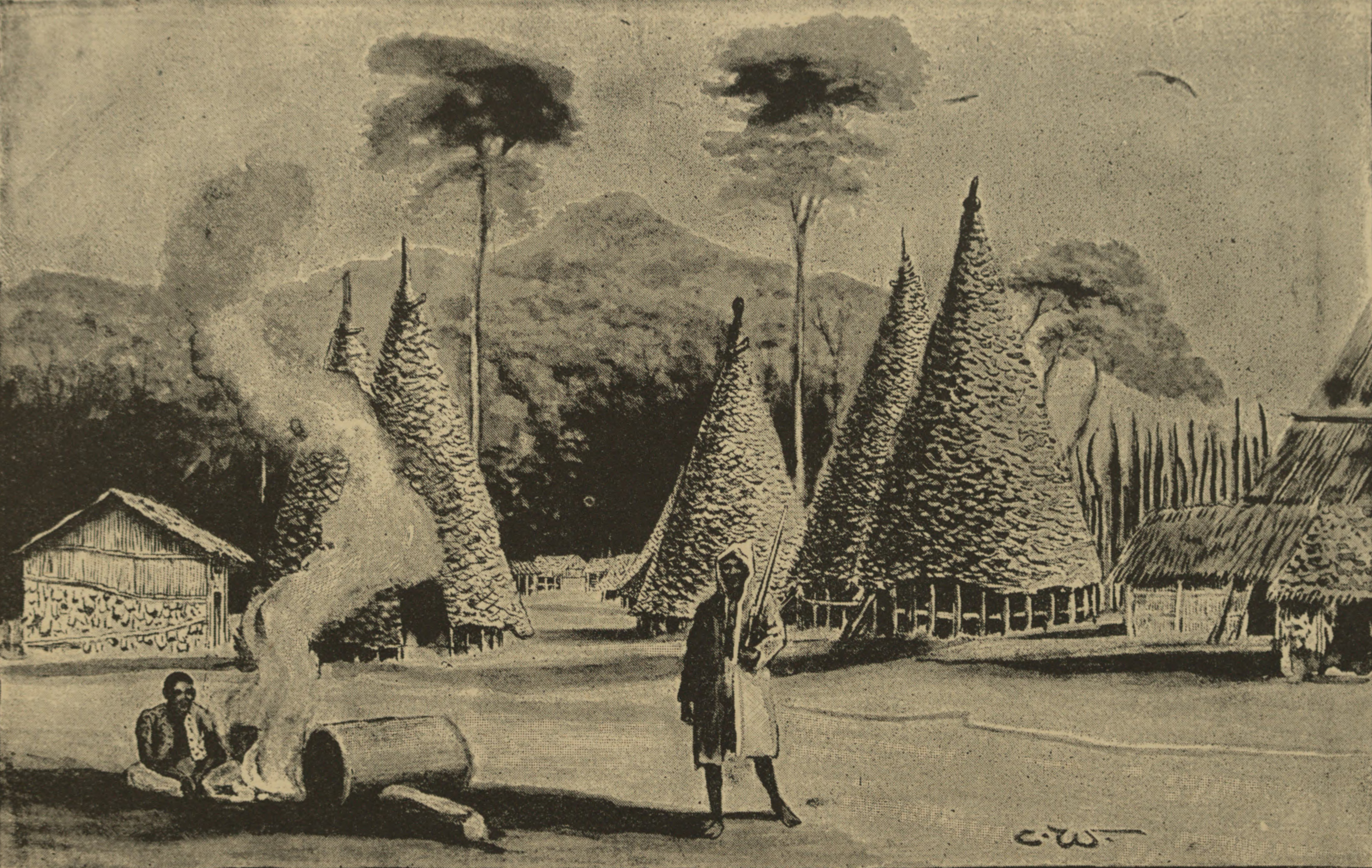
The entrenched camp at Yambuya – drawing from Jameson's diary

In June 1887, Jameson was left as second in command of the so-called rear column under Major Edmund Musgrave Barttelot at Yambuya on the Aruwimi River, while Stanley's party pushed further into the interior in search of Emin. The rear guard was left behind because Stanley had brought far too much equipment for the carriers he had. The influential Afro-Omani slave and ivory trader Tippu Tip had promised Stanley to send additional carriers to Yambuya. Thus reinforced, Jameson and his companions were to follow Stanley with the additional stores, which were to reach them from the mouth of the Congo.

But Tippu Tip failed to keep his word, and in August Jameson visited him at Stanley Falls (today Boyoma Falls) on the Upper Congo without result. No news from Stanley reached the camp, and privation and sickness soon carried off a third of its occupants. "It is horrible to watch these men slowly dying before your face, and not be able to do anything for them", Jameson noted in his diary.

Their relationship with the surrounding villages was very bad. The natives refused to sell them food, probably because of their connection to Tippu Tip's slavers, who repeatedly made raids in the area. Jameson and his companions reacted by "kidnapping women and children from villages in the area", returning them only in exchange for a ransom in the form of provisions. Even so, their supplies often got very scarce. Noting that there were no plantains and only very little meat left and that the natives still refused to trade, Jameson concluded one of his diary entries with: "As a last resource we must catch some more of their women."

As the official naturalist of the expedition, Jameson collected many birds and insects, which he described in detail in his diary. John Bierman notes, however, that "his scientific curiosity had a peculiarly cold-blooded dimension". After an attack by Tippu Tip's slavers on a nearby village, one of their commanders presented Jameson with the head of a killed villager. Jameson salted the head to preserve it and sent it to London "to be dressed and mounted" by a taxidermist; his colleague William Bonny later saw it on display in Jameson's house.

In February 1888, Jameson started on a strenuous journey to pay another visit to Tippu Tip, this time finding him at Kasongo, a further 300 miles (480 km) higher up the Congo River than Stanley Falls.

=== Jameson Affair ===
While returning with Tippu Tip to Yambuya in May, a deadly event happened that became known as the Jameson Affair. While watching some native dances at the house of the chief of Riba Riba, a riverside village, Tippu Tip told Jameson that the festivities usually concluded with a banquet of human flesh, and went on to tell of several episodes of cannibalism he had personally witnessed. Jameson commented, according to his posthumously published diary, that people back home believe all such stories to be only "'traveller's tales' ... in other words, lies". He added that one of Tippu Tip's associates replied, "Give me a bit of cloth, and see."

I sent my boy for six handkerchiefs, thinking it was all a joke ..., but presently a man appeared, leading a young girl of about ten years old at the hand, and I then witnessed the most horribly sickening sight I am ever likely to see in my life. He plunged a knife quickly into her breast twice, and she fell on her face, turning over on her side. Three men then ran forward, and began to cut up the body of the girl; finally her head was cut off, and not a particle remained, each man taking his piece away down to the river to wash it. The most extraordinary thing was that the girl never uttered a sound, nor struggled, until she fell. Until the last moment, I could not believe that they were in earnest ... that it was anything save a ruse to get money out of me ...

When I went home I tried to make some small sketches of the scene while still fresh in my memory, not that it is ever likely to fade from it. No one here seemed to be in the least astonished at it.

According to Jameson, the girl had been captured and enslaved in a raid not far from Riba Riba, probably not long before he saw her die.

==== Farran's contradictory statements ====
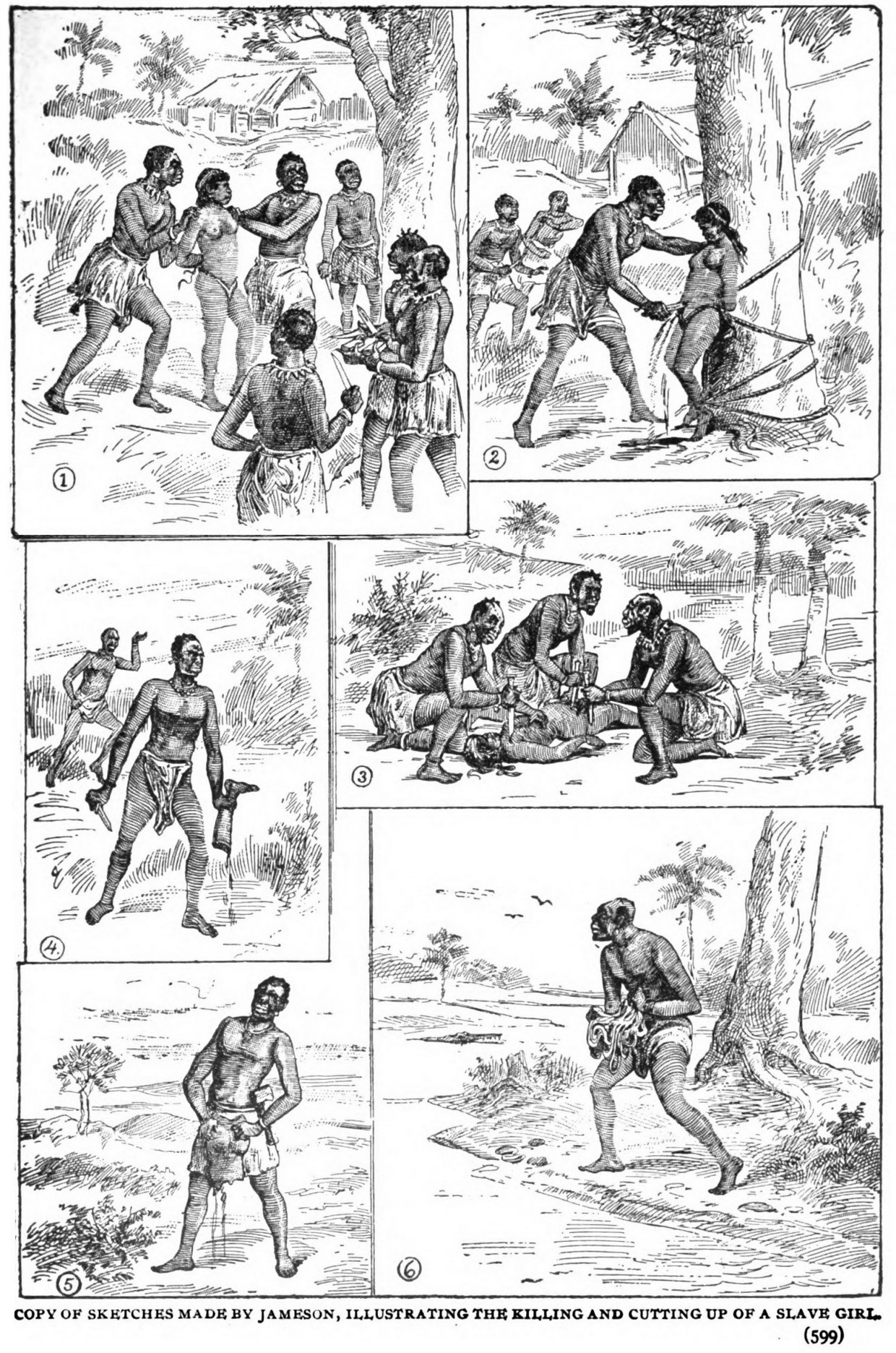
A "copy" or rather a reconstruction of Jameson's sketches, from James William Buel, Heroes of the Dark Continent (c. 1890). It follows the description of the sketches given by Farran. Bonny described their contents somewhat differently, and Jameson's actual sketches were never published.

After Jameson's death and the conclusion of the expedition, and at a time when Stanley's published account of his relations with the rear column at Yambuya was undergoing severe criticism at the hands of the survivors, Stanley published the story in the London Times (8 November 1890). He claimed that Jameson had deliberately bought the girl and donated her to cannibals in order to watch and draw her transformation into food. Stanley's most incriminating witness was Assad Farran, Jameson's interpreter, who, however, turned out to be also highly unreliable. According to a sworn statement made by Farran in Stanley's presence, Jameson had expressed curiosity to witness cannibalism, and Tippu Tip had suggested that he purchase and sacrifice a slave for the purpose. Jameson asked about the price and was told he could buy a slave for six handkerchiefs (the same amount as given in his diary). He sent for the handkerchiefs and gave them to a man who soon returned, bringing the ten-year-old girl. Together with the chief and other people present, they then went to a group of "native huts" and a man pointed out the girl to the inhabitants, stating "this is a present from the white man, he wants to see how you do with her when you eat her."

The girl was tied by a hand to a tree, while "about five of the natives were sharpening their knives", one of whom then killed her by stabbing her "twice in the belly". Similar to Jameson, Farran stated that "the girl did not scream", but added that she "knew what was going on; she was looking right and left as if looking for help, and when she was stabbed she fell down dead." She was then cut into pieces, which the natives distributed among themselves. Some of them went "to the river to wash" the "meat", while "others went straight to their huts" to cook it. While all this happened, "Mr. Jameson had his book and pencil in hand, and was making rough sketches of the scene." Afterwards he went to his house to finish them and paint them with watercolours. Farran said that he and many others saw the sketches:

They are six small sketches neatly done, the first when the girl was led by the man, the second when she was tied to the tree and stabbed in the belly, the blood gushing out, another when she was cut in pieces, the fourth a man carrying a leg in one hand and the knife in the other, the fifth a man with a native axe and the head and the breast, and the last a man with the inward parts of the belly.

Farran thus claimed that Jameson had deliberately purchased the girl rather than being taken by surprise and that he had made sketches on the spot, not afterwards. Farran's testimony is doubtful, however, because he changed his story twice. He had reason to be angry at Jameson because the latter had dismissed him, and it seems he had started to spread his accusations quite shortly after the events.

But in September 1888, when two members of the committee organizing the expedition questioned him, he revoked his statements, saying that he had merely made them because of his "bad feelings" for Jameson. In reality, he now claimed, Jameson had happened upon the scene when the girl was already dead and had merely watched and made sketches while "the cannibals [were] carving parts of her body" and getting them ready for cooking. He added that such sights were "quite common" in the region and he had repeatedly seen similar proceedings himself. He also said that he had indeed seen (possibly more than once) how cannibals tied a slave child to a tree prior to killing and butchering her, but it had happened some other time and Jameson had nothing to do with it.

This version of the events is in conflict with Jameson's own admission that he saw the murder, and Farran was unable to convincingly explain why his statement in front of the committee members differed so much from what he said earlier and later. Bierman supposes that his recantation was due to "enormous" pressure which the relief committee may have exerted to avoid scandal, while Christian Siefkes suspects he "must have been somewhat opportunistic, telling people what he thought they preferred to hear".

However, Farran had indeed been present at Riba Riba and there are many similarities between Jameson's diary (unpublished at that time) and the version of the events he had told to Stanley, establishing a common ground about what really seems to have happened, regardless of Farran's temporary recantation. Both accounts agree on the price Jameson paid for the girl, her age, her being killed by being stabbed twice in the upper body, and the fact that the events started in the house of the local chief. That six handkerchiefs were enough to pay for a young slave girl is also in agreement with other pricing information known from the Congo at that time – European cloth was a valuable import, while slaves, especially young children (for whom there was little demand except for the cannibalistic one) could be bought cheaply.

==== Other witnesses and interpretations ====
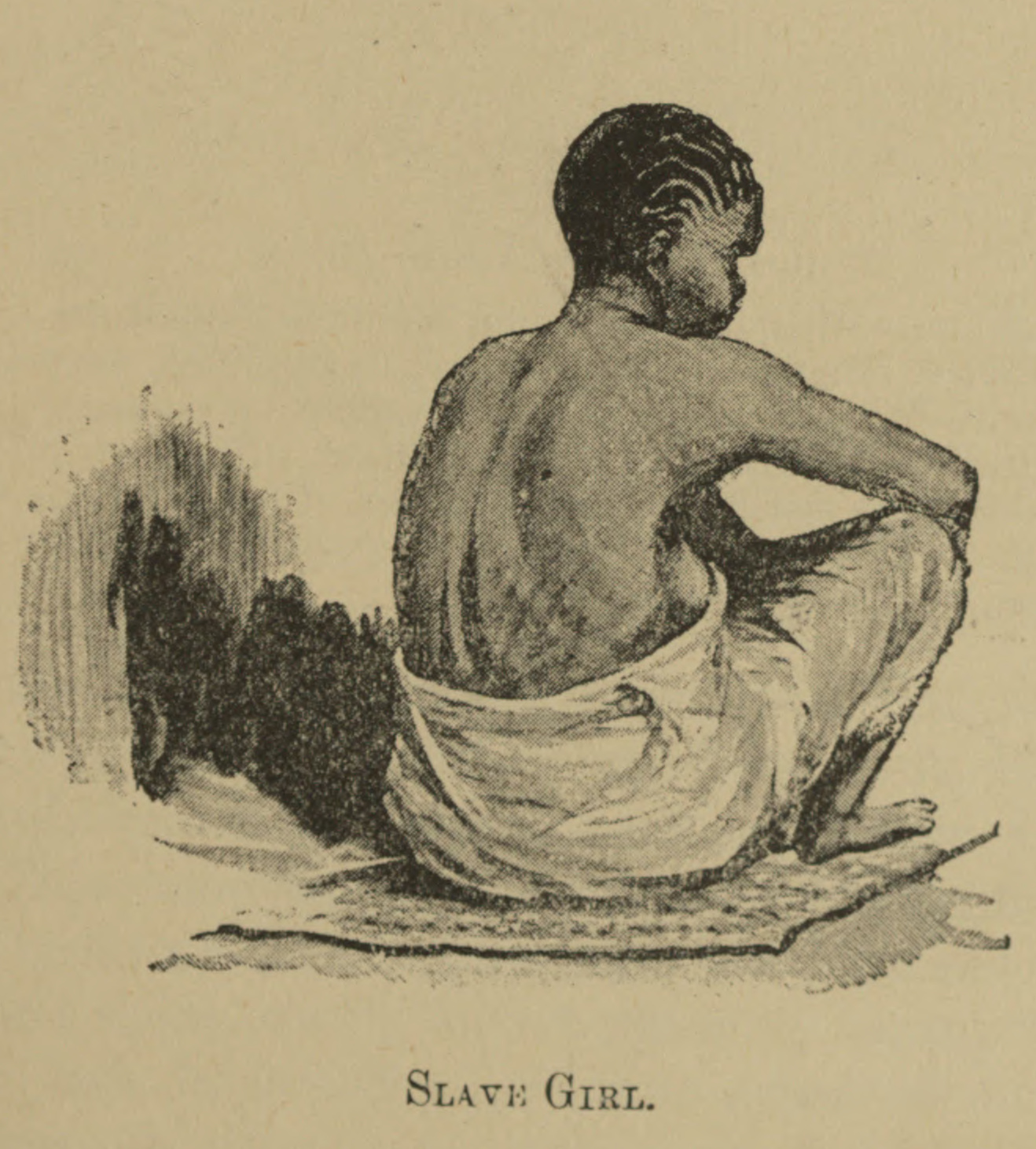
A slave girl – drawing from Jameson's diary

Another account published by Stanley came from William Bonny, one of Jameson's companions at Yambuya. Bonny had not been present at Riba Riba and so could not know exactly what had happened, but he too had seen the sketches. He described their contents somewhat differently from Farran, though:

Mr. Jameson showed me the sketches and described the scene in detail. I cannot now describe each of the six sketches; but they begin with the picture of the girl being brought down tied by one hand to the native, who holds in his right hand the fatal knife. He is then represented thrusting the knife into the girl, while the blood is seen spurting out. Then there is the scene of the carving up of the girl limb by limb, and of the natives scrambling for the pieces and running away to cook them, and the final sketch represents the feast.

According to Bonny, Jameson thus stayed around until the end, also watching while the girl's mortal remains were consumed. He confirmed that Jameson had "paid six cotton handkerchiefs for the girl" and added that, regarding "the Jameson story, there can be no doubt about the absolute correctness of Mr. Stanley's statement ... Mr. Jameson himself related to me every incident as described by Mr. Stanley."

Robert B. Edgerton interprets this as meaning that "Jameson had admitted to [Bonny] that he had known the girl would be killed and had calmly sketched the scenes while they were taking place." While Bonny's written statement about the event was fairly short, Stanley in his turn said he had "learn[ed] from Bonny that Jameson ... had seemed to take pride in being the only European to have witnessed such a cannibalistic act, and that he enjoyed showing others his sketches." From these statements, Edgerton draws the conclusion that Jameson had indeed apparently knowingly purchased the girl "in order to satisfy his intellectual curiosity about cannibalism", sketching "what happened as she was killed and her body was butchered, then cooked, and finally eaten."

Siefkes is more inclined to give Jameson some benefit of the doubt. He notes that "Bonny does not say what exactly Jameson told him" and supposes that, rather than openly admitting to having deliberately paid for murder, Jameson's tale must have been similar to what he recorded in his diary. He also judges the first part of the diary entry as plausible, pointing out that an anecdote which Jameson records as having heard from Tippu Tip (about large-scale cannibalism among the latter's own allies) immediately before Jameson's comment about "traveller's tales" also appears in a biography of the slaver published by German author Heinrich Brode. As this indicates that Jameson had indeed heard the anecdote from Tippu Tip (like Brode did), Siefkes accepts that the course of the conversation may indeed have "naturally" led to a discussion of opportunities for witnessing cannibalism – rather than Jameson asking to do so out of the blue, as Farran suggests.

Siefkes also notes that the tree-tying and knife-sharpening scene may well have been an embellishment invented by Farran (maybe indeed inspired by a scene he had seen at some other time), because Bonny does not mention a tree in his account of the sketches, rather describing the first two of them in a way that is very similar to the version of the girl's death recorded in Jameson's diary. He therefore suspects that Farran added this scene in order to make Jameson appear more callous – giving him more time in which he could have intervened to save the girl, but did not.

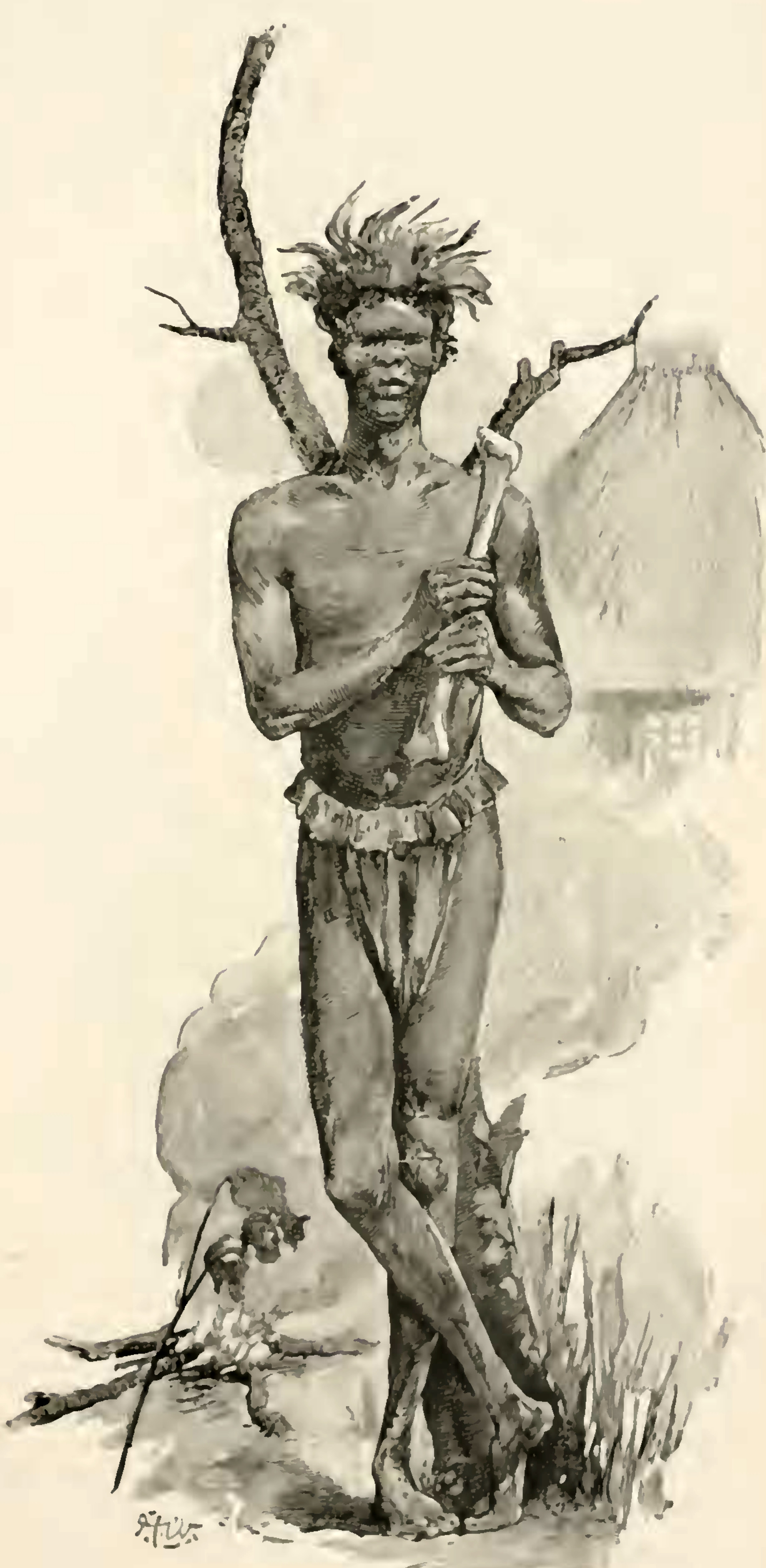
"A cannibal scene with human flesh roasting over the fire" – drawing by Herbert Ward

Nevertheless, Siefkes is unwilling to accept Jameson's claim that he was entirely taken by surprise and had no time to prevent the girl's murder. Jameson's diary shows him as well informed about the locally widespread cannibal customs, as he had made various notes about them, including about a discussion with self-admitted cannibals who freely talked about whom they liked to eat (both enemies and slaves) and how they liked to prepare them (for big feasts, spit-roasting whole corpses, preferably of "nice, fat, young women", seems to have been popular among the wealthy). Jameson himself had once seen human leftovers from a cannibal meal. His colleague Herbert Ward was even better informed – he had repeatedly seen how human flesh was roasted, had been invited to eat it by well-intended hosts, and had had other conversations with cannibals who failed to see anything wrong in their custom. Pointing out that Ward and Jameson certainly had enough time in Yambuya to talk about their mutual experiences, Siefkes considers it "hardly credible that the idea that he might be about to witness a cannibal act never occurred to" Jameson, especially after the explicit announcement by Tippu Tip's associate promising it.

Siefkes also suspects that the latter told Jameson how much he would have to pay to witness such an act, finding it otherwise hard to explain why Jameson would have handed over six valuable (compared to local prices) handkerchiefs without further prompting. J. A. Richardson similarly argues that Jameson knew very well that cannibalism was a real custom and "that he would not have paid out handkerchiefs for nothing", concluding that he bought the girl to watch the "spectacle" of her slaughter. Both Siefkes and Tim Jeal, as well as various journalists discussing the event, notice that Jameson did not make "the slightest effort to save the child's life", nor did he stop the subsequent butchering and cooking of her body (a body that was his property according to local customs).

While not explicitly judging the credibility of Jameson's and Farran's tales, Bierman observes that the former seems to have held "no rancor" towards Tippu Tip and his men, despite them having deliberately (and for no clearly discernible reason) arranged the girl's death if his version of the event is to be believed. His diary entry for the day continues by stating "In the afternoon I had a long talk with Tippu-Tib", in which they seem to have talked entirely about "matters concerning the expedition". The cannibalized girl is not mentioned again. Bierman also points out that, though the fact that Jameson had witnessed the girl's butchering was "beyond dispute", the assertion of a deliberately ordered murder was originally largely dismissed in the English-speaking world. Instead of accepting that a British gentleman might have done such a thing, Farran was "wished away as a typically malicious Levantine liar", while Bonny was considered "a noncommissioned malcontent, motivated by resentment" against the other members of the rear guard.

==== Consequences and context ====
While Stanley himself had published the charges against Jameson and similarly severe charges against Barttelot, his apparent attempt at saving his reputation by putting the blame for the disastrous course of the Emin Pasha Relief Expedition on others backfired. Both Stanley's and the expedition's reputation were permanently damaged by the resulting discussion of the behaviour of the rear guard's members, and the bad publicity likely contributed to the fact that privately organized, non-scientific expeditions into Africa ceased after that time.

Edgerton puts the incident in the context of the Congo at that time, observing that while the direct involvement of Jameson, a "gentlemanly" European, was unusual, the slave girl's fate was not, since "cannibalism ... was undoubtedly widespread" and "many people were murdered expressly so that others might feast upon their bodies". Eyewitness accounts describe the purchase, butchering, and consumption of slaves as a "daily-life activity, free from strong emotions", seen by those who practised it as not essentially different from the eating of goats and other animals. Human flesh was described as particularly tasty, especially when it came from children, (Note: As late as 1950, a Belgian colonial administrator accidentally ate "the meat [of] a young girl" and was impressed by its "remarkably delicious" taste.) and there are more cases on record where "healthy children were stabbed to death to provide a feast for their owners". Other slave children had their throats cut or were beheaded for the same purpose, sometimes after a period of deliberate fattening.

Several years after Jameson watched the girl die in Riba Riba, Congo Free State official Guy Burrows, now stationed in the same village, rescued a young slave boy from becoming the main dish of a banquet planned by his master. The latter not only freely admitted the plan, but failed to see anything wrong with it. Burrows talked with a colleague who had been aware of the planned banquet but had seen no reason to bother as the custom was practised in many of the surrounding villages. Generally, the colonial Free State (founded in 1885) seems to have done little to stop the violence. Indeed, some of its European officers themselves "developed a taste for human flesh", according to historian Peter Forbath.

=== Death ===
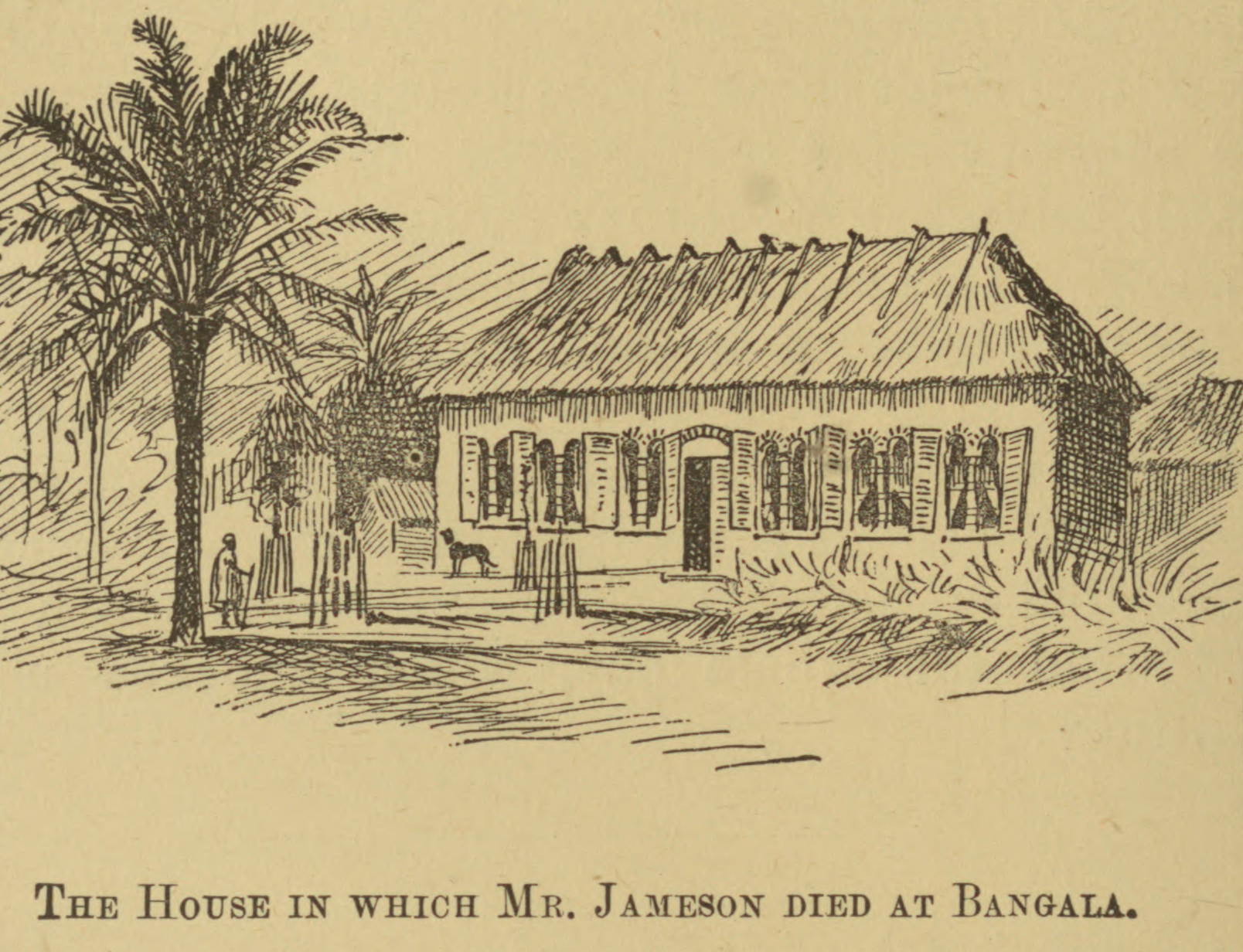
The House in Bangala Station where Jameson died, presumably drawn by Herbert Ward (from Jameson's posthumously published diary)

Jameson's visit to Tippu Tip had been a success in so far as the latter had finally sent at least several hundred of the promised porters, and so Jameson, Barttelot, and their companions prepared to finally leave Yambuya and set the rear guard in motion again, which happened on 11 June. But Tippu Tip's Manyema porters turned out to be highly undisciplined and the troop soon split into two parts, with Barttelot pushing ahead and Jameson trailing behind with the slower part of the group.

On 19 July, Barttelot was shot dead at Unaria in a dispute with a Manyema headman. On receiving this disastrous news, Jameson hurried to Unaria, and thence to Stanley Falls, where he arrived on 1 August. On 7 August, he was present at the trial and execution of Sanga, Barttelot's murderer, while trying to negotiate an agreement with Tippu Tip about finding a trustworthy leader for the unruly natives. Jameson offered to pay 500 pounds out of his own purse for the services of one of Tippu Tip's nephews, but the deal fell through. Instead, Tippu Tip himself volunteered to lead the rear guard to Lake Albert, but asked for an enormous 20,000 pounds fee.

Unable to make such a decision by himself, Jameson decided to travel down the Congo River to Bangala Station, where Herbert Ward had been sent to wait for telegrams from the expedition committee, in order to contact the committee about how to proceed. Soon after leaving Stanley Falls on 8 August, he caught a cold that developed into a severe fever. Ward was shocked when Jameson's escort brought him to Bangala Station, unconscious and in a "deathlike" state, and one day later, on 17 August, he died. Ward, who was at his bedside when he died, reported his last words as: "Ward! Ward! they're coming; listen. Yes! they're coming – now let's stand together." On the 18th he was buried on an island in the Congo opposite the village.

== Legacy ==
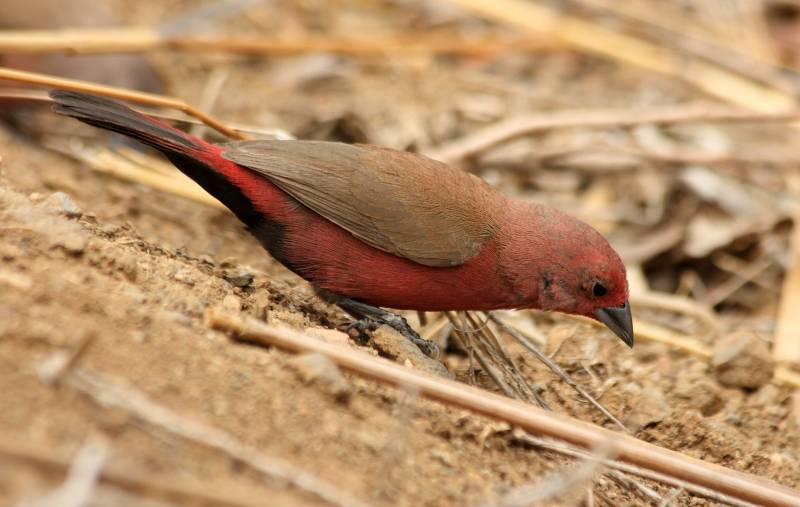
Jameson's firefinch (male)

A small but valuable collection of birds and insects which Jameson had made at Yambuya was sent home in 1890. The bulk of his collections remained with his widow, but a part of his ornithological collections was placed in the Natural History Museum, London. His diary of the Emin Pasha expedition was published posthumously in 1890.

Already in 1877, during his first big journey, he identified the black honey-buzzard. Three African bird species – Jameson's antpecker, Jameson's firefinch, and Jameson's wattle-eye – were described by him during his Congo journey and are named after him. Some ornithologists have suggested to change these names because of his "ghastly acts" in Africa.

A number of authors see Joseph Conrad's novella Heart of Darkness as inspired by the events and personalities of the rear guard, suggesting that Barttelot, Jameson, or both may have served as models for its central character Kurtz. Several scholars consider Jameson the most plausible candidate, arguing that like Kurtz he appeared to have been "a cultivated, even idealistic man until 'the wilderness found him out'" and that he too "had been present at certain ... dances ending with unspeakable rites." Chris Fletcher, one of the authors holding this view, points out that there are also similarities in their "personal appearance and manner" and in remarks attributed to both of them when they were little children. He notes that "arguments proposing Barttelot have tended to fade in favour of Jameson".

== See also ==
- The Rear Column, a play

== Bibliography ==
This article incorporates text from a publication now in the public domain: Watkins, Morgan George (1892). "Jameson, James Sligo". In Lee, Sidney (ed.). Dictionary of National Biography. Vol. 29. London: Smith, Elder & Co.

- Bierman, John (1992). Dark Safari: The Life Behind the Legend of Henry Morton Stanley. London: Sceptre.
- Edgerton, Robert B. (2002). The Troubled Heart of Africa: A History of the Congo. New York: St. Martin's Press.
- Jameson, James S. (1891). The Story of the Rear Column of the Emin Pasha Relief Expedition. New York: National Publishing.
- Jeal, Tim (2007). Stanley: The Impossible Life of Africa's Greatest Explorer. London: Faber and Faber.
- Richardson, J. A. (1993). "James S. Jameson and Heart of Darkness". Notes and Queries. 40 (1): 64–66.
- Siefkes, Christian (2022). Edible People: The Historical Consumption of Slaves and Foreigners and the Cannibalistic Trade in Human Flesh. New York: Berghahn. ISBN 978-1-80073-613-9..
