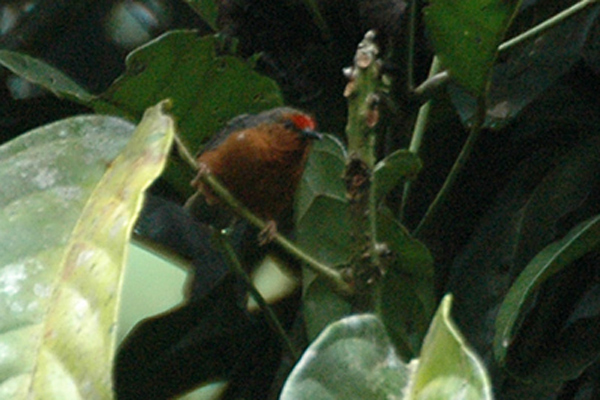
- Adult male near Bwindi (Uganda)

Conservation status
- Least Concern (IUCN 3.1)

Scientific classification
- Kingdom: Animalia
- Phylum: Chordata
- Class: Aves
- Order: Passeriformes
- Family: Estrildidae
- Genus: Parmoptila
- Species: P. jamesoni

Binomial name
- Parmoptila jamesoni (Shelley, 1890)

Synonyms
- Parmoptila rubrifrons jamesoni

= Jameson's antpecker =

Species of bird

Jameson's antpecker (Parmoptila jamesoni) is a songbird species found in central Africa. Like all antpeckers, it is tentatively placed in the estrildid finch family (Estrildidae). It has traditionally been included as a subspecies of P. rubrifrons (red-fronted antpecker) and the common name Jameson's antpecker was sometimes used for both taxa. But today, they are often considered distinct species.

Jameson's antpecker inhabits tropical lowland moist forest in Uganda, Tanzania and the Democratic Republic of the Congo. When Jameson's and the red-fronted antpeckers were still evaluated as one species, they were classified as a species of least concern by the IUCN. Unlike its western relative which is declining noticeably, P. jamesoni is still common and widespread. Therefore, its status has not changed after its elevation to a full species.

Jameson's antpecker is named after James Sligo Jameson. Given Jameson's violent behavior in Africa, ornithologists have suggested changing the common name of this species.

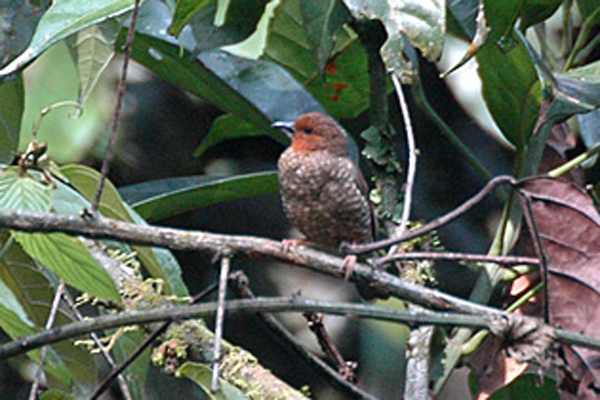
Adult female near Bwindi (Uganda)
