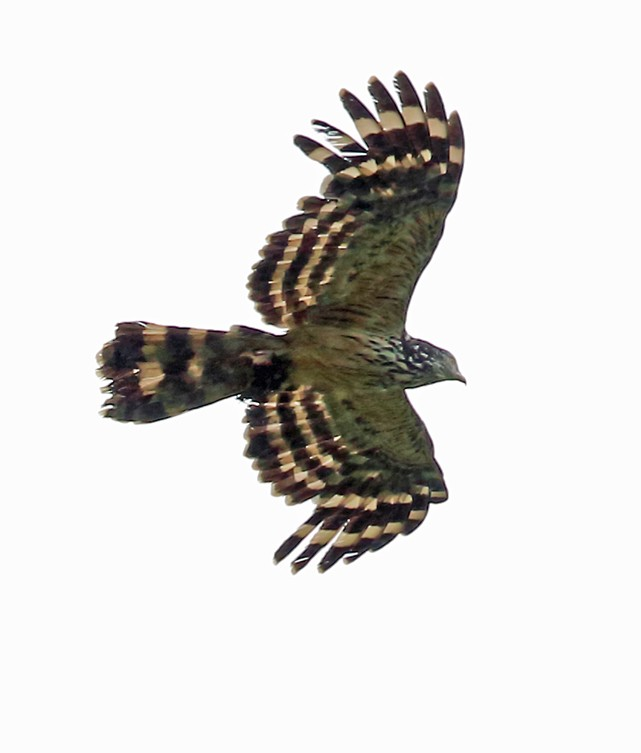

Conservation status
- Least Concern (IUCN 3.1)

Scientific classification
- Kingdom: Animalia
- Phylum: Chordata
- Class: Aves
- Order: Accipitriformes
- Family: Accipitridae
- Genus: Henicopernis
- Species: H. longicauda

Binomial name
- Henicopernis longicauda (Lesson & Garnot, 1828)

= Long-tailed honey buzzard =

Bird of prey species of New Guinea

The long-tailed honey buzzard (Henicopernis longicauda) is a bird of prey in the family Accipitridae.

It is found in New Guinea and some neighboring island groups. Its natural habitats are subtropical or tropical moist lowland forest and subtropical or tropical moist montane forest.

== Description ==
The Long-tailed honey buzzard is described as having a thin body, small head, long rounded tail and wide, round wings. They fly with their wrists forward while spreading their characteristically "fingered" primary feathers. The wing and tail feathers have dark black barring. The face and bill are pale and the iris is yellow. The head and breast feathers are lightly streaked. The total length, including the tail feathers, is reported to be from 50–61 cm (22 in). The wingspan ranges from 105–140 cm (48 in). The tail feather length ranges from 29–37 cm (13 in). The size of males as a proportion of the size of females was calculated to be 89%. The males weigh 447–630 grams and the larger females weigh 570–730 grams. Adults can be identified by their three visible boldly black bars on the body and wings, while the fourth bar is hidden. They have bluish-white feet. Juveniles can be identified by their much narrower bands, all four of which are visible.

== Taxonomy ==
The Long-tailed honey buzzard is a member of the order Accipitriformes, and are considered typical diurnal raptors. They are found in the family Accipitridae, the hawks, eagles and allies. The Long-tailed honey buzzard is one of two species in the genus Henicopernis. The genus was found to be part of a clade inside of the pernine kites, along with Hamirostra and Lophoictinia. The four species of this new clade were the only accipitrids found to have a deletion (3 bp) within the RAG-1 sequence. This clade was found to be the sister clade to Aviceda, and a unification of its four species under the genus Hamirostra has been proposed. Counter to former reports, the genus was not found to be closely related to the genus Pernis.

The group common name "honey buzzard" for the genus Henicopernis is disagreed upon by some sources, as members of the genus Pernis are the "true honey buzzards" and members of the genus Henicopernis do not resemble true honey buzzards any more than they resemble Square-tailed and Black-breasted kites, their more closely related sister taxa. Therefore, the common name Long-tailed buzzard is also frequently used for this species.

== Habitat and distribution ==
The Long-tailed honey buzzard is native to New Guinea and its surrounding islands. These include the Bay Islands of Japen and Biak, the Northwest Islands of Misool, Batanta, Salawati and Waigeo, the Aru Islands, the Southeast Islands of Fergusson and Normanby. On mainland New Guinea, they are reported to be found in the Trans-Fly savannah ecoregion on the southern end of the island, but also more broadly throughout New Guinea, except for the mountainous regions of the Western, Central and Eastern ranges.

The Long-tailed honey buzzard is found typically in the regions’ lowland rainforests, hill forests and montane forests. It is a rainforest specialist and is restricted to New Guinea's rainforest habitats. It is found up to elevations of 3000 m. Long-tailed honey buzzards do not migrate and are considered endemic to New Guinea. There are estimated to be at most 100,000 individuals of this species.

== Behavior ==
The Long-tailed honey buzzard is described as the quintessential hawk seen flying overhead in the forests of the region. They are observed to prefer remaining alone or in pairs. They sail and circle slowly above the canopy cover of the forest, but also pass through open regions below the canopy where they perch to observe their surroundings. They are reported to not be shy and are easily spotted. They are diurnal (active during the day) and crepuscular (active around twilight).

=== Diet ===
The Long-tailed honey buzzard feeds primarily on insects such as ants, grasshoppers and especially adult wasps and wasp larvae. They follow wasps to their nests and pull out larvae with their feet. They also feed on bird and lizard eggs, tree-climbing lizards, small mammals and small birds. One sighting recounts seeing an individual catching land-bound prey in a grassland near a forest and carrying it back into the forest to consume.

=== Vocalizations ===
The only published information on Long-tailed honey buzzard vocalizations describes the series of calls they produce during display as “goshawk-like”. Typical goshawk display calls include many rapid notes in succession, called a chatter, or a single long call, referred to as a wail. Otherwise, they are described as being usually silent.

=== Reproduction ===
Long-tailed honey buzzards typically build stick nests in the crowns of tall trees. They may have preferences for Auracarias, Planchonellas and Pandanus. They may also build their nests as low as only 7 m, or on the edges of cliffs. Their breeding season takes place from late in the wet season through to the dry season, which occurs from New Guinea’s autumn through to the spring. No egg information is currently known, including clutch size. One observation record observed a single offspring.

== Conservation threats ==
The most pressing threat to the Long-tailed honey buzzard is deforestation. Although considered of least concern status, population numbers, trends and biology are poorly researched, and populations in some regions may be declining significantly.
