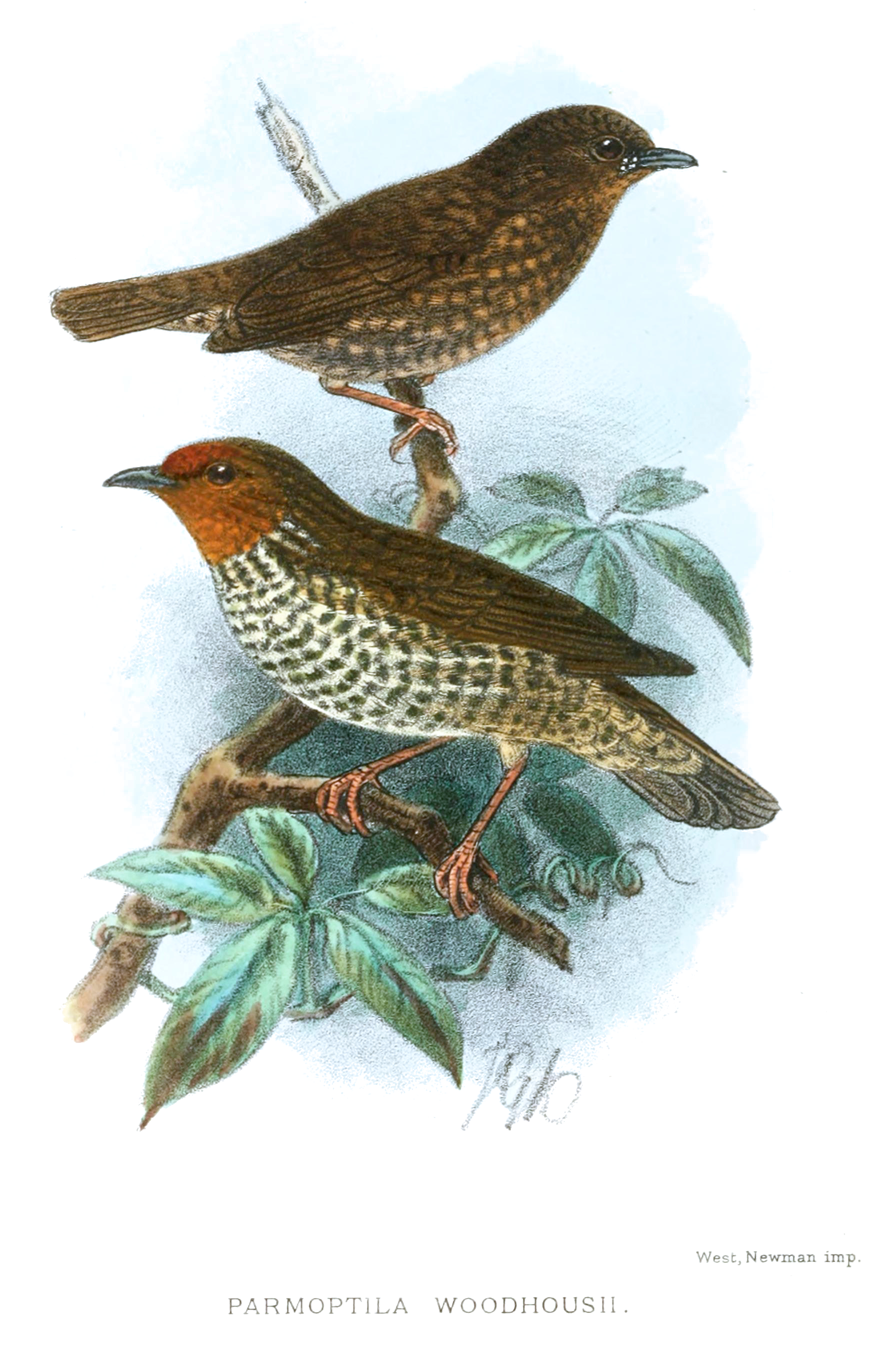

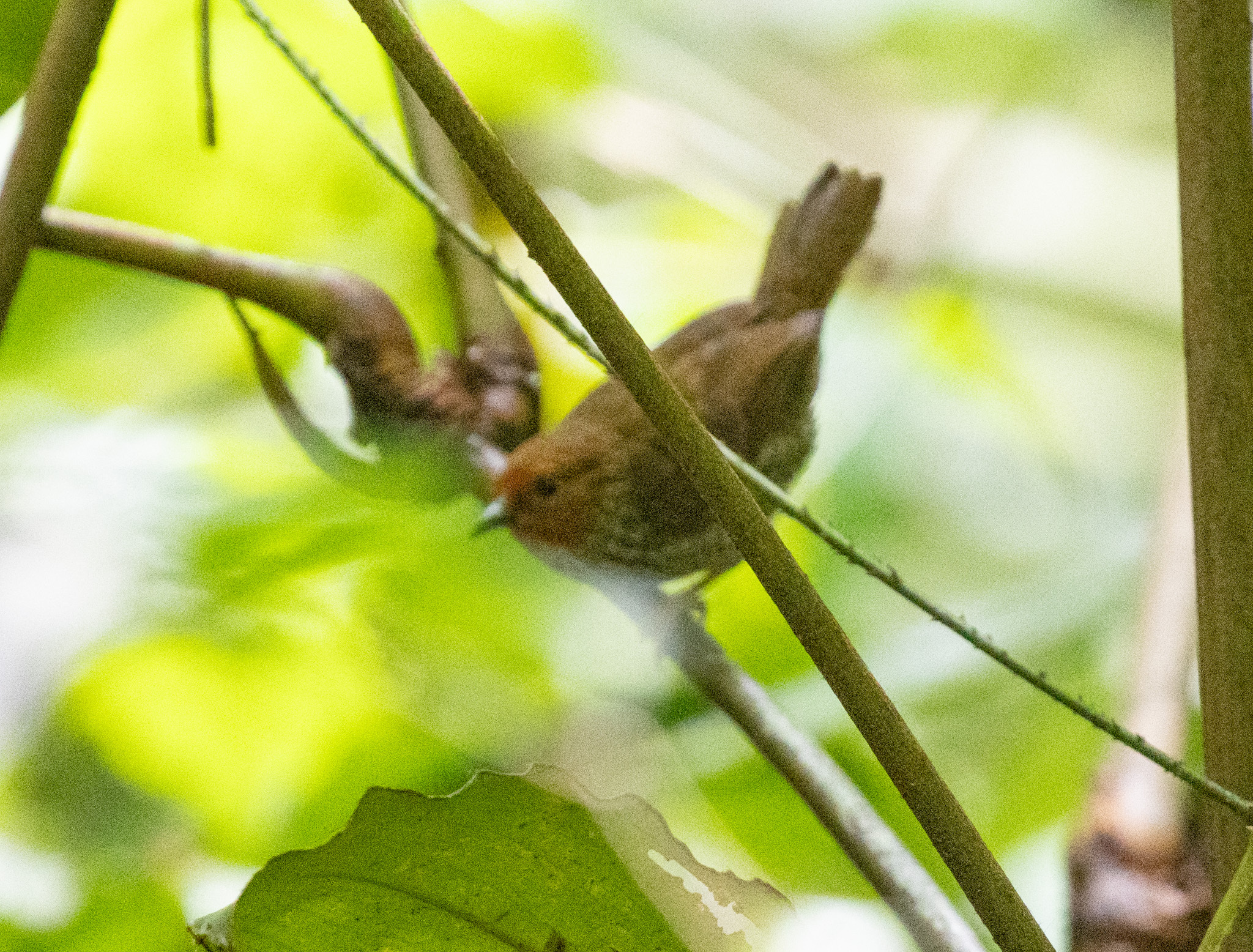

Conservation status
- Least Concern (IUCN 3.1)

Scientific classification
- Kingdom: Animalia
- Phylum: Chordata
- Class: Aves
- Order: Passeriformes
- Family: Estrildidae
- Genus: Parmoptila
- Species: P. woodhousei

Binomial name
- Parmoptila woodhousei Cassin, 1859

= Woodhouse's antpecker =

Species of bird

Woodhouse's antpecker (Parmoptila woodhousei) is a species of passerine bird found in West Africa that is placed in the estrildid finch family, Estrildidae. The name commemorates the American explorer and collector Samuel Washington Woodhouse.

== Description ==
The male has a bright red fore crown, brown under parts, the adult female is brown above with a rufous-brown wash to the throat and scaled brown and white from the breast to the vent.

== Distribution and habitat ==
Woodhouse's antpecker inhabits subtropical or tropical lowland moist forest at Angola, Cameroon, Central African Republic, the Republic of Congo, the Democratic Republic of the Congo, Equatorial Guinea, Gabon, Nigeria, Tanzania and Uganda. It is found in forest from 700-1800 m, where it actively forages in tangled vines and creepers in the undergrowth. It has an estimated global extent of occurrence of 190,000 km^{2}.

In Uganda it can be seen in Budongo Central Forest Reserve within the Nature Reserve known as N15 (Nyakafunjo Block 15).
