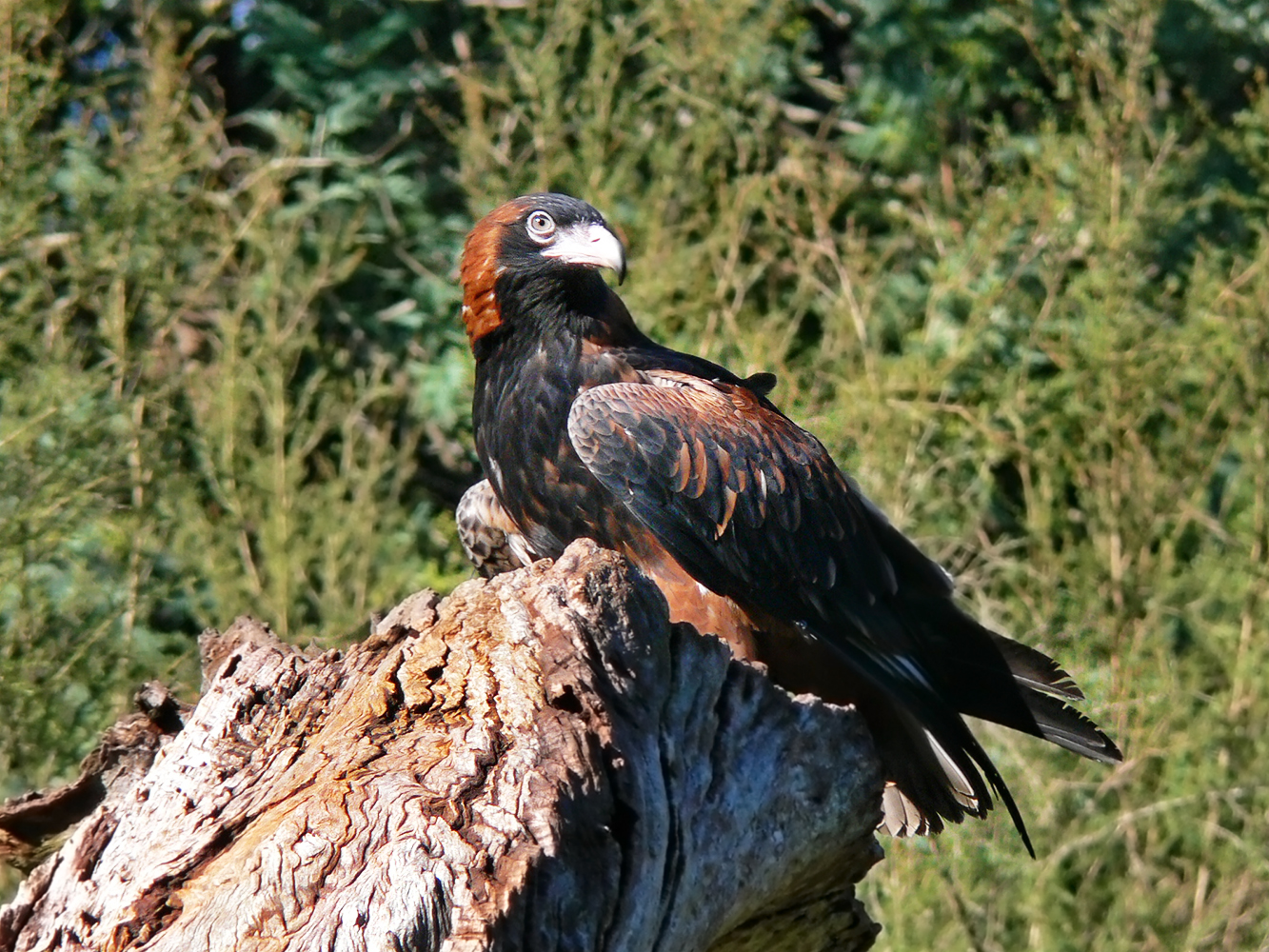

Conservation status
- Least Concern (IUCN 3.1)

Scientific classification
- Kingdom: Animalia
- Phylum: Chordata
- Class: Aves
- Order: Accipitriformes
- Family: Accipitridae
- Genus: Hamirostra; Brown, 1846
- Species: H. melanosternon

Binomial name
- Hamirostra melanosternon (Gould, 1841)

Synonyms
- Buteo melanosternon Gould, 1841; Hamirostra melanosternon Brown, 1845 or 1846; Gypoictinia melanosterna Kaup, 1847

= Black-breasted buzzard =

Species of bird

The black-breasted buzzard (Hamirostra melanosternon) is a large raptor endemic to mainland Australia. First described by John Gould in 1841, it forms part of the family Accipitridae (hawks and eagles) and is most closely related to the square-tailed kite (Lophoictinia isura). It is a versatile hunter known for its special skill in cracking eggs. The species is common throughout most of its range.

== Description ==
Intermediate in body size between the well-known larger wedge-tailed eagle (Aquila audax) and the smaller little eagle (Hieraaetus morphnoides), the black-breasted buzzard is one of Australia's largest birds of prey and one of the world's largest kites alongside the red kite, which is slightly less heavy but has a longer total length. An adult black-breasted buzzard measures 51 to 61 cm (20 to 24 in) in height including its short square tail. The buzzard's outstretched wingspan measures 141 to 156 cm (4 ft 8 in to 5 ft 1 in), rendering the bird distinctive in flight as its wings are conspicuously long relative to its stout body and tail. Buzzards appear sexually monomorphic (identical in physical appearance), although the adult female is slightly larger, weighing approximately 1,330 g (2.93 lb) compared to the 1,196 g (2.637 lb) of the adult male. The weight range for the species is from 1,150 to 1,600 g (2.54 to 3.53 lb). It is most closely related to the Square-tailed kite (Lophoictinia isura).

The black-breasted buzzard is striking in appearance due to the distinctive markings of the adult plumage. From the underside, the mainly black colouring of the body and wings is contrasted by thick white panels near the end of the wings. From above, the black plumage is broken by a rich mottled red across the back and shoulders. Birds in the immature and juvenile phases of growth display pale brown colouring, with dark to black streaks increasing with age. Chicks have white coloured down, described as 'hair-like' on their heads. Adult birds may be individually identified during flight by broken or missing flight feathers, or when perched closely together by subtle differences in the red of the back and shoulders.

The common call of the black-breasted buzzard is described as a repeated hoarse yelping or short sharp yap or yelp. Adult females also make a soft drawn-out wheezing call to solicit their mate to copulate, undertake nest-building, forage for food and defend the nest. Young buzzards also use a wheezing call to solicit food from their parents.

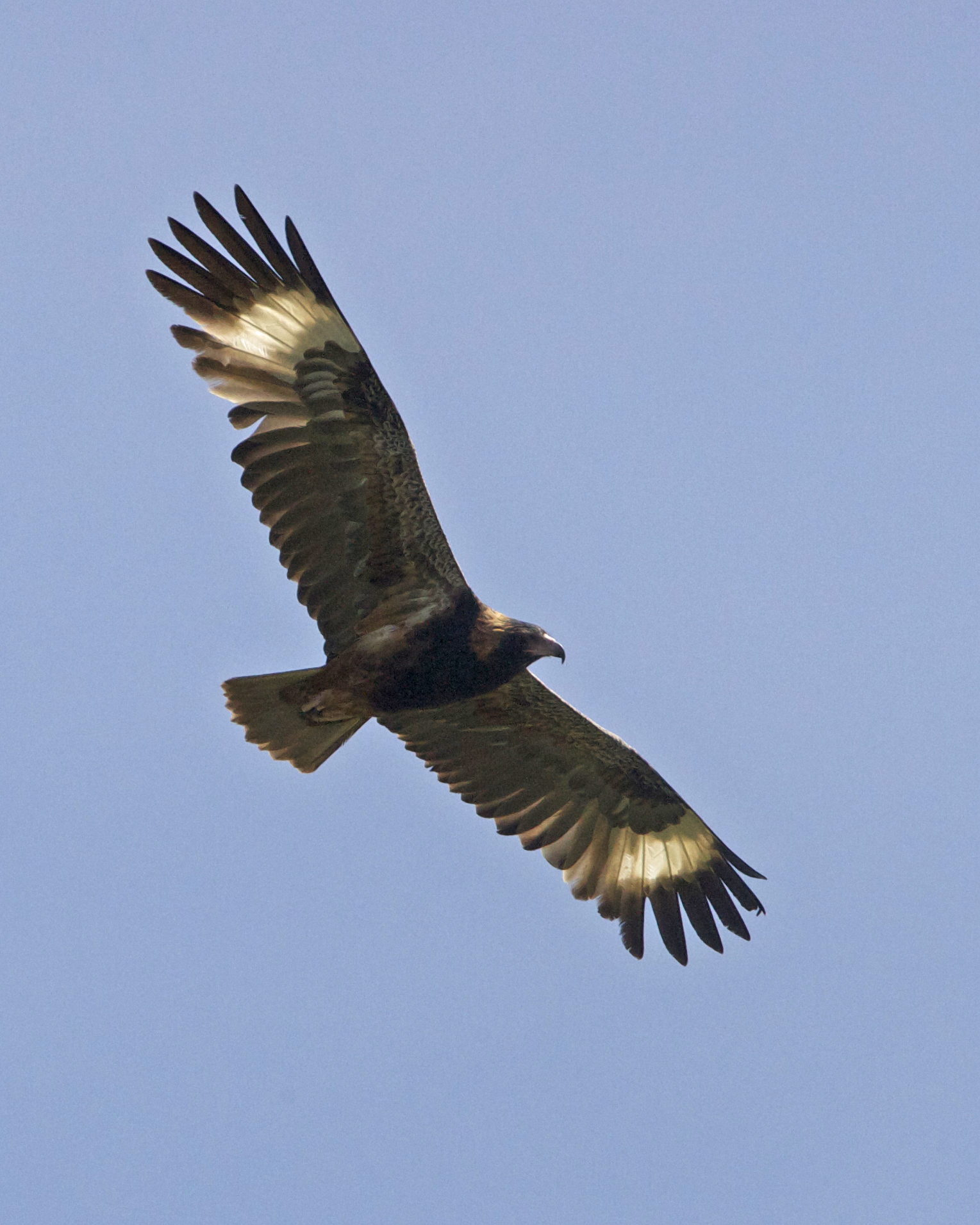
The distinctive shape and colour of the buzzard in full flight, Mary River, Northern Territory.

== Distribution and habitat ==
The black-breasted buzzard is widely but sparsely distributed throughout northern and inland Australia in areas with less than 500 mm annual rainfall. The buzzard's range stretches from north-eastern South Australia, north-western New South Wales, northern Queensland, the Northern Territory and the north-western exterior of Western Australia. The buzzard does not occur in Victoria, the Australian Capital Territory or Tasmania, due to their wetter temperate climates.

Found to occur in wooded and open habitats, the black-breasted buzzard is most commonly observed in riparian forests and tall-open woodlands surrounded by mid-dense shrublands. In a study of raptor habitat association in central Australia, it was most commonly observed in River Red Gum (Eucalyptus camaldulensis) open woodland, demonstrating a significant preference for this habitat type.

== Diet ==
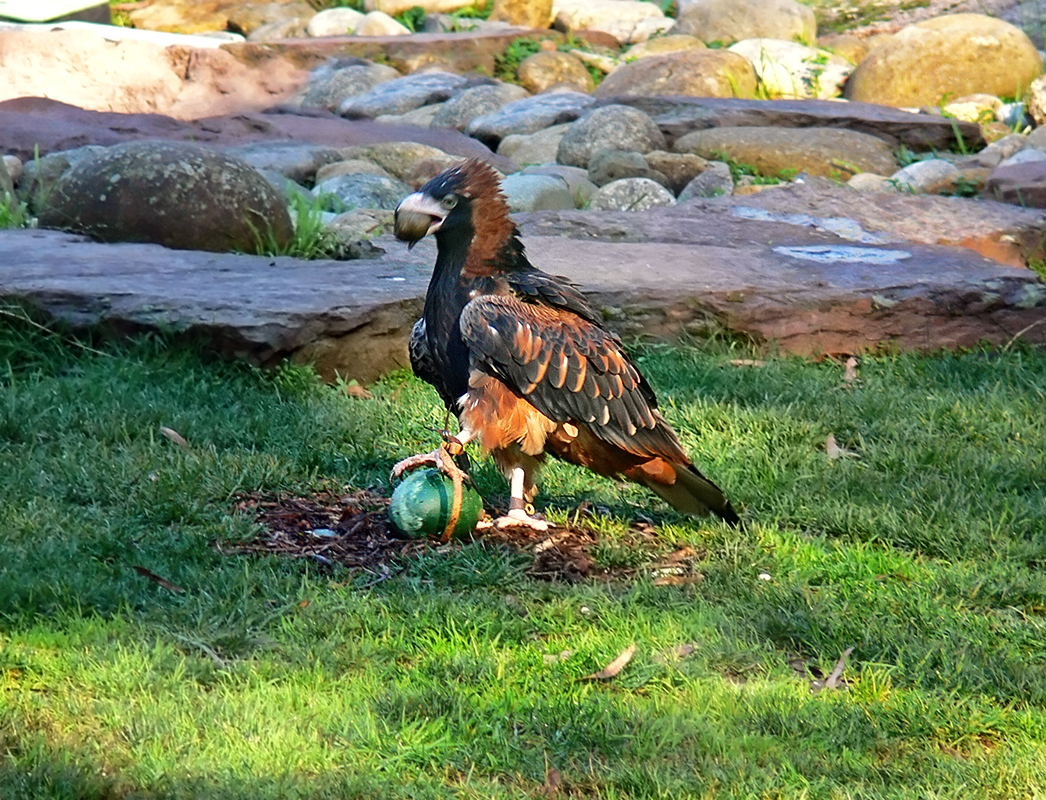
A captive buzzard demonstrates how it uses a stone to crack an emu egg.

The black-breasted buzzard hunts a variety of reptiles (large lizards and small snakes), small mammals (such as young rabbits and small rodents, even juvenile kangaroos), large insects, and birds (up to the size of pigeons, parrots, and even ducks), and raids bird nests to steal eggs and nestlings, including those of other raptor species (such as the black kite and nankeen kestrel) and of colonial terns. Not regarded as a specialist or highly proficient hunter, the buzzard's diet often includes carrion of large mammals that may be sourced along roads, tracks, and creek lines.

It uses a variety of methods to search for food, including soaring in transects over low vegetation, undertaking cooperative hunting with conspecifics and observing from high up on unconcealed perches. The buzzard may drop, pounce, dive or glide to attack its prey.

Skilled in terrestrial hunting, the black-breasted buzzard is famous for its use of stones to crack the eggs of large ground-nesting birds such as the emu (Dromaius novaehollandiae), magpie goose (Anseranas semipalmata), brolga (Grus rubicundus) and Australian bustard (Ardeotis australis). Stones are either dropped onto or thrown at the eggs to break them open, allowing the buzzard to access the contents for food. The buzzard may also use its beak to crack eggs directly.

== Reproduction ==
The black-breasted buzzard is usually monogamous, forming lifelong pair-bonds. The buzzard nests in trees of notable height and girth, larger and more independent from others generally available. The trees may be dead with bare exposed limbs, or live and foliated, with nests positioned in prominent forks high up in the canopies. Both parents contribute equally to nest-building and often work together in unison on the nest structure. Nests are constructed from dead sticks and leafy branches, with materials gathered from the ground or broken off trees and carried to the nest site in feet or beak. Nest dimensions have been measured at 1.2m long x 0.8m wide x 0.4m deep. Nest dimensions are larger than that of any other raptor species, including the larger-bodied wedge-tailed eagle.

The black-breasted buzzard lays its eggs from August to October, with breeding believed to be stimulated by increased day length, as well as by increased food availability often linked to rainfall events. A usual clutch comprises two eggs laid at an interval of approximately 8–13 days and incubated for a period of 32–38 days. Nestlings remain in the nest for between 68–73 days before fledging around December. The female tends the nest for the majority of time while the male hunts and returns food. Usually only one chick per nest survives to fledge each season.

Fresh leafy branches, separate from the basic nest structure, are added periodically during the breeding cycle. This greenery is thought to serve medicinal purposes, such as to aid in parasite and pathogen control, and or to reduce bacteria. Other hypotheses suggest the greenery may play a role in courtship, and or assist in nestling development. Although known to occur in a variety of avian species from a range of climates and habitats around the world, this behaviour is not yet fully understood.

== Conservation ==
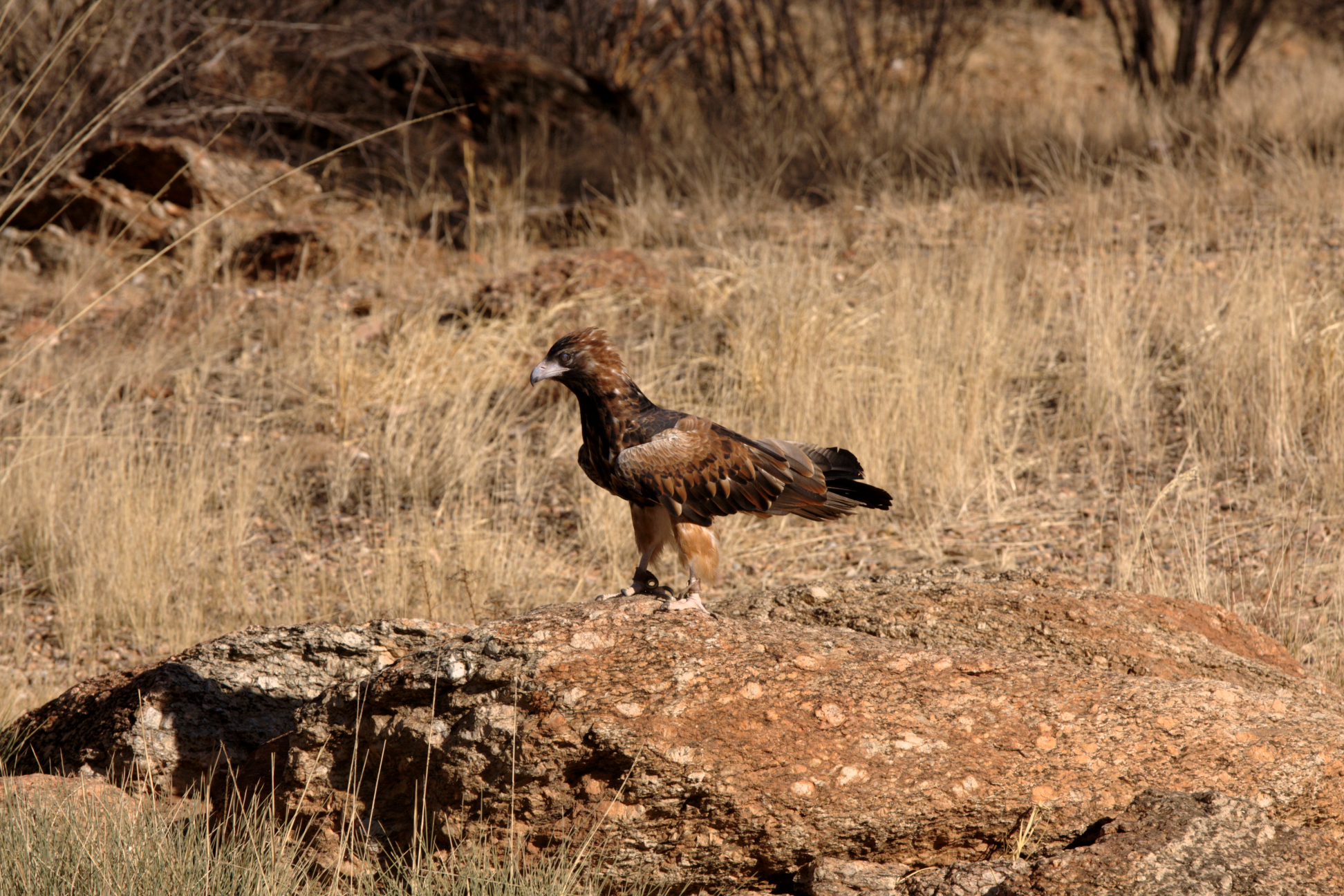
The semi-arid habitat of the black-breasted buzzard, Australia.

The current IUCN Red List ranks the black-breasted buzzard of Least Concern. While it is not listed as a conservation concern by the Australian Commonwealth, it is listed as Vulnerable in New South Wales and Rare in South Australia. Recent studies have assessed the black-breasted buzzard as one of many avian species of particular conservation concern in the Western Division of New South Wales. The global population estimate for the black-breasted buzzard is uncertain, varying between 1000–10,000 individuals.

There has been a significant decline amongst Australian raptor species including the black-breasted buzzard since European settlement in the late 1700s. Historic records indicate the black-breasted buzzard became extinct in some areas of its former range by as early as the 1930s. Causes of population declines in raptor species of the arid and semi-arid regions of Australia include broad-scale landscape changes due to extensive pastoralism and clearing of native vegetation; overgrazing by stock, feral animals and increased kangaroo populations; altered fire regimes; the introduction of destructive feral predators such as the house cat (Felis catus) and red fox (Vulpes vulpes); and the cessation of traditional Aboriginal hunting and land management practices. Intense periods of drought through the 1900s and 2000s are known to have compounded the impacts on already stressed raptor communities.

Inadvertent poisoning of raptors through ingestion of prey killed by toxins is a well-known threat to raptor species worldwide and a likely contributor to their decline in Australia. Such toxins are frequently introduced to the environment by humans to combat pest animals and plague insects. Other potential causes of decline include direct persecution by humans in the form of illegal egg collection and shooting which has been recorded in a number of Australian raptor species, for example the osprey (Pandion haliaetus) in South Australia. and Europe and the Tasmanian wedge-tailed eagle (Aquila audax fleayi).

Climate change leading to increased periods of drought in the arid and semi-arid areas of Australia is a concern for the survival of many raptors species, particularly those with specialist diets dependent on a limited array of prey species. The black-breasted buzzard has a varied diet including carrion that may afford it some resilience in the face of intense drought when carcasses of perished large mammals become abundant. However, it also has a year-round preference for living and nesting in the riparian zones of creek lines and drainage channels. As these tend to dry up under drought conditions, resultant habitat loss is likely to threaten the buzzard's reproductive viability and survival. More frequent and intense wildfire events will also increasingly contribute to the decline of large trees and potential black-breasted buzzard habitat.

A program of landscape conservation that engages all land managers and stakeholders and includes the protection of existing habitat and revegetation of lost habitat, is considered the first step in protecting the black-breasted buzzard, its relatives and the overall biodiversity of arid and semi-arid Australia.
