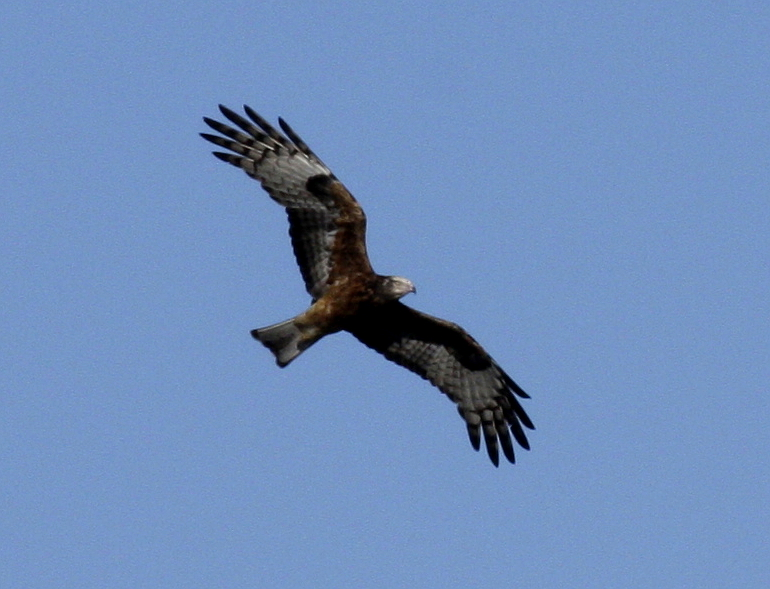

Conservation status
- Least Concern (IUCN 3.1)

Scientific classification
- Kingdom: Animalia
- Phylum: Chordata
- Class: Aves
- Order: Accipitriformes
- Family: Accipitridae
- Genus: Lophoictinia; Kaup, 1847
- Species: L. isura

Binomial name
- Lophoictinia isura (Gould, 1838)

= Square-tailed kite =

Species of bird

The square-tailed kite (Lophoictinia isura) is a medium-sized bird of prey native to Australia. It is in the family Accipitridae, which also includes many other diurnal raptors such as kites, eagles and harriers.

== Taxonomy ==
German naturalist Johann Jakob Kaup described the square-tailed kite in 1847.

The square-tailed kite is monomorphic with no recorded geographic variations.

== Description ==
As an adult the square-tailed kite is a medium-sized raptor, with the following features:

- Length: 50–56 cm (tail is about half the length of bird)
- Wingspan: 130–145 cm
- Weight: Male-501g, Female-650g

=== Plumage variation ===
As an adult, the squared-tailed kite has a white face, with pale eyes and black streaks across the crown. The breast is also heavily streaked. The ventral surface of the wings has a rufous-brown lining, a dark carpal crescent, and a boldly barred finger. There is also a pale white patch on the ventral surface of the wings, at the base of the primary feathers; the saddle, rump and central upper tail-coverts are blackish, while the upper tail-coverts are grey-brown and fade into a small pale patch above the tail. The tail itself is square with dark sub-terminal band. Square-tailed kites also have a black bill, with a pink base and cere, and short legs and feet which are whitish or cream.

This species does not experience seasonal changes to the colouration of its plumage nor is the species sexual dimorphic. Juveniles are easily distinguished from adults by the lack of the white face and their richer rufous colouration (on both the head and the body). They are also significantly less streaked than adults.

Square-tailed kites can be confused with a range of other similar sized kites and raptors. The white face and shape of the tail, as well as the overall size of the bird, are considered diagnostic features in such cases.

== Distribution and habitat ==
The square-tailed kite is a specialised canopy-dwelling predator, and can be found in a number of different habitats including open and temperate forests, woodlands, scrub, heathland, riverine trees, and savannah. Square-tailed kites can also be found in well-vegetated urban areas such as golf courses and parks. They are seldom found on the ground.

Square-tailed kites are widespread throughout Australia, but are not densely distributed. The birds are solitary, but can be observed in pairs or family units (parents and dependent young) during their breeding seasons. In Eastern New South Wales, nesting square-tailed kites were found to have home territories of 50 km^{2}, with spaces of around 13 km between nesting pairs. Current population estimates from the IUCN Red List indicate a population of between 1000 and 10,000 individuals, of which 67% are thought to be sexually mature individuals.

Many square-tailed kites migrate annually, but the timing and locations of these migrations are dependent on the home territory of each individual bird, with some birds not migrating at all.

=== Threats ===
Land clearing for agricultural use, illegal egg collection, and hunting are the major threats facing this species. Land clearing is a particularly significant threat, with the removal of trees that could be used by the birds for nesting and breeding causing dispersal and competition for the resources that are still available. This is particularly evident around coastal areas where urban or rural development is occurring.

=== Conservation status ===
Square-tailed kites are classified on the IUCN Red List as Least Concern. This classification is a result of the species large range, wide distribution, and stable population trends, though the species has previously been classified as Vulnerable (1994–96) and has a range of different classifications at state levels. In New South Wales the species is considered Vulnerable, while it is considered Threatened in Victoria, Endangered in South Australia, and Rare in Queensland.

Due to the stable population trend for this species, and its IUCN Red List classification of Least Concern, there are no active conservation efforts specific to this species. The species will benefit from any environmental protections in place across its range that preserve suitable square-tailed kite habitat, as well as revegetation of open or urban areas.

== Behaviour ==
=== Flight ===
Square-tailed kites can glide or soar, depending on the positioning of their wings. For gliding, the bird's wings are held in medium modified dihedral, and when soaring the wings are in a medium to strong dihedral, and the tips of the primary flight feathers are curled up. These birds are well suited to flight, and use these techniques to travel in or above the tree canopy. They are rarely seen on the ground.

=== Diet and foraging ===
Square-tailed kites hunt for food by soaring slowly above or through the tree canopy, skimming over grass, flying transect lines, or quartering. The diet of square-tailed kites includes avian prey-both smaller birds and eggs, small mammals such as mice, insects, molluscs (snails), and reptiles. Avian prey is typically young birds such as nestlings or juveniles, and square-tailed kites have been observed preying upon a range of other bird species including crested pigeons (Ocyphaps lophotes), New Holland honeyeater (Phylidonyris novaehollandiae); eastern yellow robin (Eopsaltria australis), rufous whistler (Pachycephala rufiventris) and juvenile Pacific koel (Eudynamis orientalis).

=== Reproduction ===
As part of the mate selection process, square-tailed kites perform courtship flights. These flights are typically aerobatic in nature and allow the individuals to exhibit their flying skills. The male pursues the female, and the pair perform aerial rolls in which the talons are presented but do not make contact. These flights can be accompanied by vocalisations.

The breeding season of square-tailed kites is specific to the location of the birds. Those in temperate Australia will breed between July and February, while those in more tropical areas will breed around April. When nesting, square-tailed kites prefer large, tall trees in uncleared areas. Both the male and female birds will participate in the building of the nest, or will add to disused nests of other species. Nest shape will either be the typical bowl-shaped nest, or a stick platform, and construction of the nest usually takes around 3 weeks. During the breeding season the female will roost on the nest at night, while the male roosts in a nearby tree, and when young are present both the male and female will roost near the nest. Only one attempt to breed is made each season, with a clutch producing 1–2 white eggs that are a round to oval shape. The incubation period for this species is around 40 days and offspring care is biparental. Incubation of the eggs is primarily done by the female, as the male hunts and brings food to the nest, however males have also been seen incubating eggs. The nestling stage lasts about 8 weeks, with an additional two months of dependence post-fledging. On hatching, offspring is semi-altricial with feathers and vocalisations developed by 3 weeks, post hatching.

Square-tailed kites exhibit pre-copulatory behaviour such as vocalisations and allopreening. The species will also exhibit territorial behaviour during the nesting and incubation periods of their annual cycle, making vocalisations and flying at other birds to move them away from nesting sites. Threat displays for this species include 'staring' at other birds with the bill open, and the feathers of the head and neck upright. The feathers of the wings and mantle are also raised, which serves to make the bird look larger and more threatening.
