= Vinnytsia Museum of Local History =

Museum in Vinnytsia, Ukraine

Vinnytsia Regional Museum of Local Lore
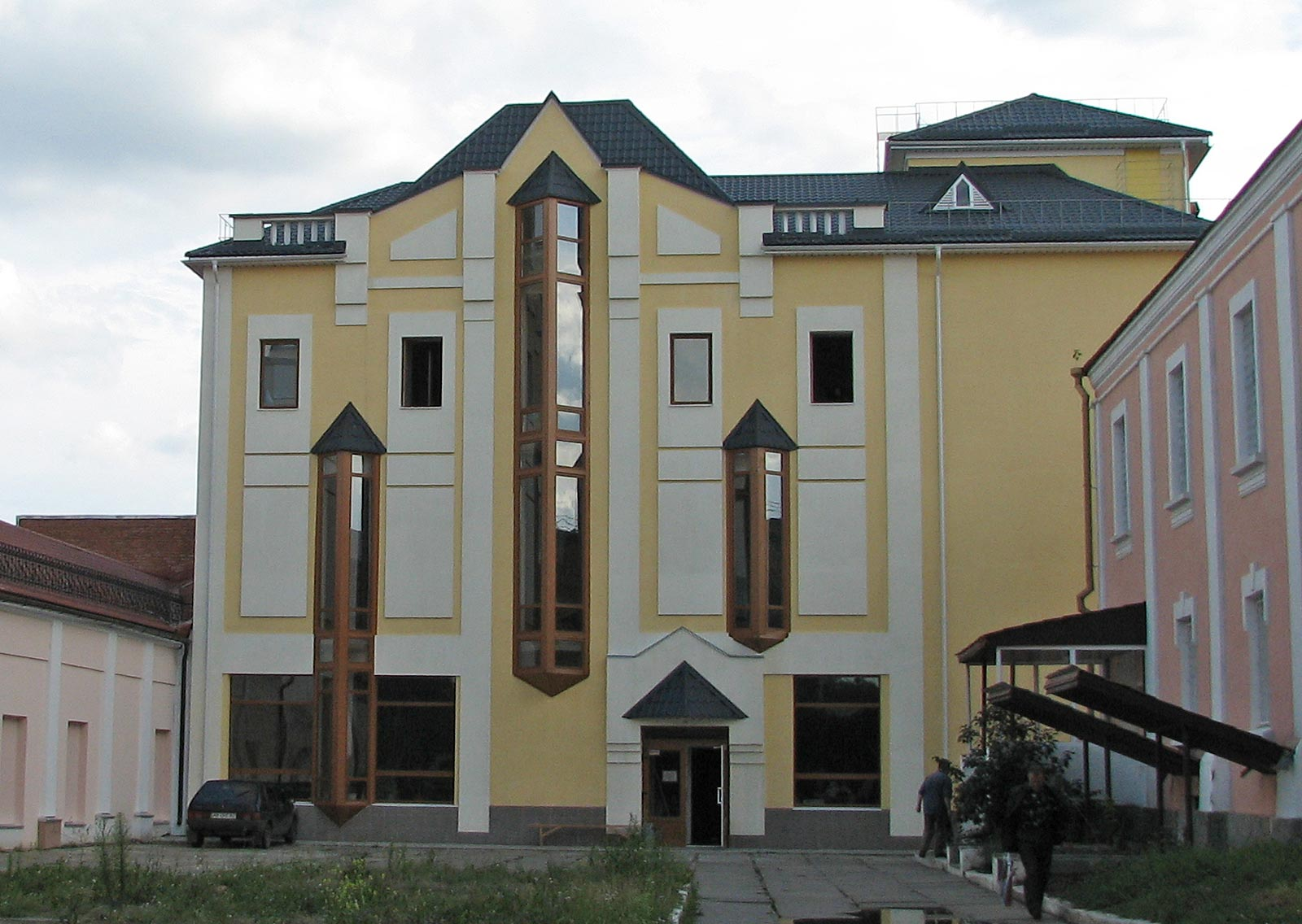
- Established: May 14, 1918
- Location: Soborna Street, 19, Vinnytsia, Ukraine
- Type: Local History Museum
- Director: Ruslan Mykhailovych Palamarovsky
- Website: vinnytsia-museum.in.ua

The Vinnytsia Regional Museum of Local Lore is a regional local history museum in the city of Vinnytsia, Ukraine. The museum has the largest collection of materials and documents on the history, ethnography, and culture of Eastern Podolia. The museum is located in the city centre, in 19 Soborna Street, which is part of the historical complex of Vinnytsia Walls. The museum is visited by over 200,000 people, and nearly 1,500 tours are conducted. The director of the museum since September 25, 2025 has been Ruslan Mykhailovych Palamarovsky.

== History ==
The museum was founded on May 14, 1918 by the decision of the Vinnytsia City Duma, at the initiative of artists Stepan Slobodianiuk-Podolian and Vyacheslav Korenev, Lawyer Gustav Briling and archivist Yuriy Oleksandrovych. The organisation was funded by the Podolia Society for the Protection of Historical Monuments.

The collection was created as a historical and domestic museum of Applied arts and Fine art. The first exhibition opened in Many 1919 in the Vilynskyi House on Dvorianska Street (now Hrushevskoho Street, 30), where Vyacheslav Korenev lived, who was the first director. It mainly consisted of artworks, household items, furniture and Numismatics, and was based on the collections of the Vinnytsia County Zemstvo, the Podolia Society of Agriculture and Agricultural Industry, and private collections of the Podolia Society for the Protection of historical Monuments. A significant portion of the exhibits were taken from private estates, such as the collection of Princess Maria Shcherbatova of the Nemyriv Estate, and heiress to the Potocki family and the Stroganov family. The museum was visited by 6,506 people in 1921.

Vilynskyi House - where the museum was located between 1919 and 1921

Topcheyev House - where the museum was located between 1921 and 1929

The museum moved to the Topcheyev House (now Arkhitektora Artynova Street, 21) in December 1921. During this time the museum consisted of three departments - historical and archaeological, ethnographic and economic, and the arts. The museum included 10,372 items, of which 3,500 belonged to the ethnographic and economic department. Yuriy Oleksandrovych donated a collection of towels, Embroideries, and unique photographs to the museum. In 1923, Stepan Slobodianiuk-Podolian donated a collection of coins, weapons, books and paintings to the museum. Since 1924, the museum has been called the historical and household museum. Since 1925, under the leadership of Gustav Briling, the museum collection was enriched with ethnographic items, and applied arts. Between 1924 and 1927, the museum collection included collections from museums in Haisyn, Bershad and Bratslav. In 1926, 16,000 people visited the museum.

The museum moved to 19 Soborna Street in Summer 1929 with a new industrial exhibition. Village churches were surveyed, and the museum conducted its first archaeological excavation.

During the Nazi occupation of Ukraine, the Nazis removed over 6,000 items from the museum - mostly items from the numismatic, ethnographic and archaeological collection. Most of the collection was saved due to the efforts of the museum staff V. Podolsky, M. Slavsky, T. Tymofieva, and N. Starodvorska. The museum re opened in Autumn 1944. A small portion of the stolen items were returned from Kraków in the late 1940s.

The museum was closed for renovation from October 1964 to June 1970. A new building was constructed, and the museum received 20 halls totalling 2,000m². The designs were undertaken by Ukrainian, Russian and Latvian artists. At the time, the museum had four departments: nature, pre revolutionary history, history of Soviet society, and art. The subsidiary Vinnytsia Art Museum was founded in 1987.

The storage facilities were repaired in 2005 and 2006, and the façade and roof were rebuilt. The museum came 2nd in the First All-Ukrainian Museum Festival, held in Dnipropetrovsk, presenting the exhibition of "Workshop of the Slavic Jeweller of the 5th-7th Centuries".

== Subsidiaries ==
The museum has a library founded in 1920. Its pre war collection was destroyed in 1943. The modern collection contains over 10,400 editions from the late 18th century to the early 21st century, mainly in Ukrainian, Russian and Polish.

The Vinnytsia Oblast Afghan War Veterans museum was opened on February 15, 1993 within the Vinnytsia water tower.

The museum also operates the Mykola Leontovych Museum, the Museum of the Battle of Batozh, the Podolia Ethnography Cabinet, the Mykhailo Hrushevsky Museum, and The site of Werwolf to remember the victims of Nazism.

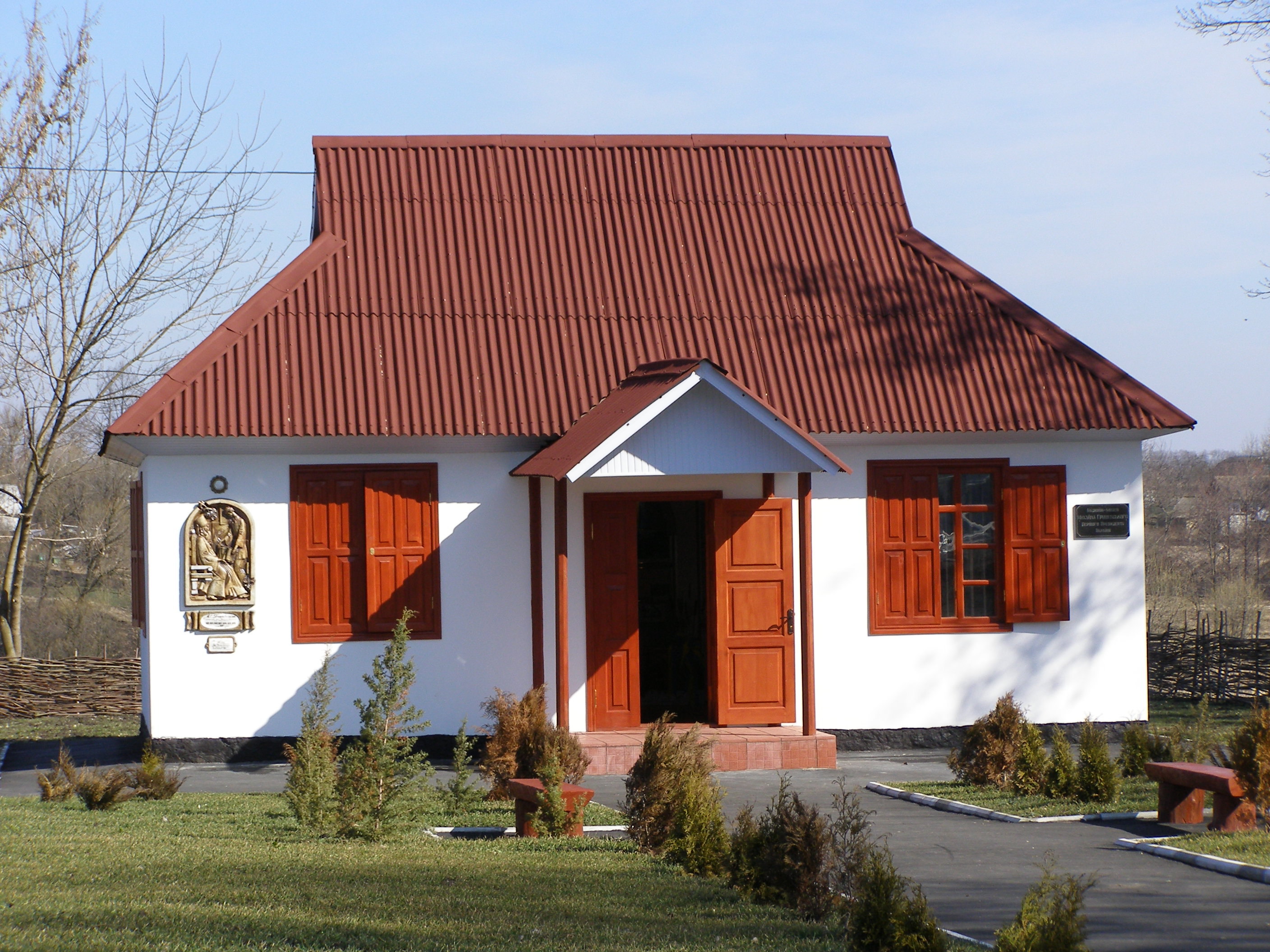
Mykhailo Hrushevsky Museum

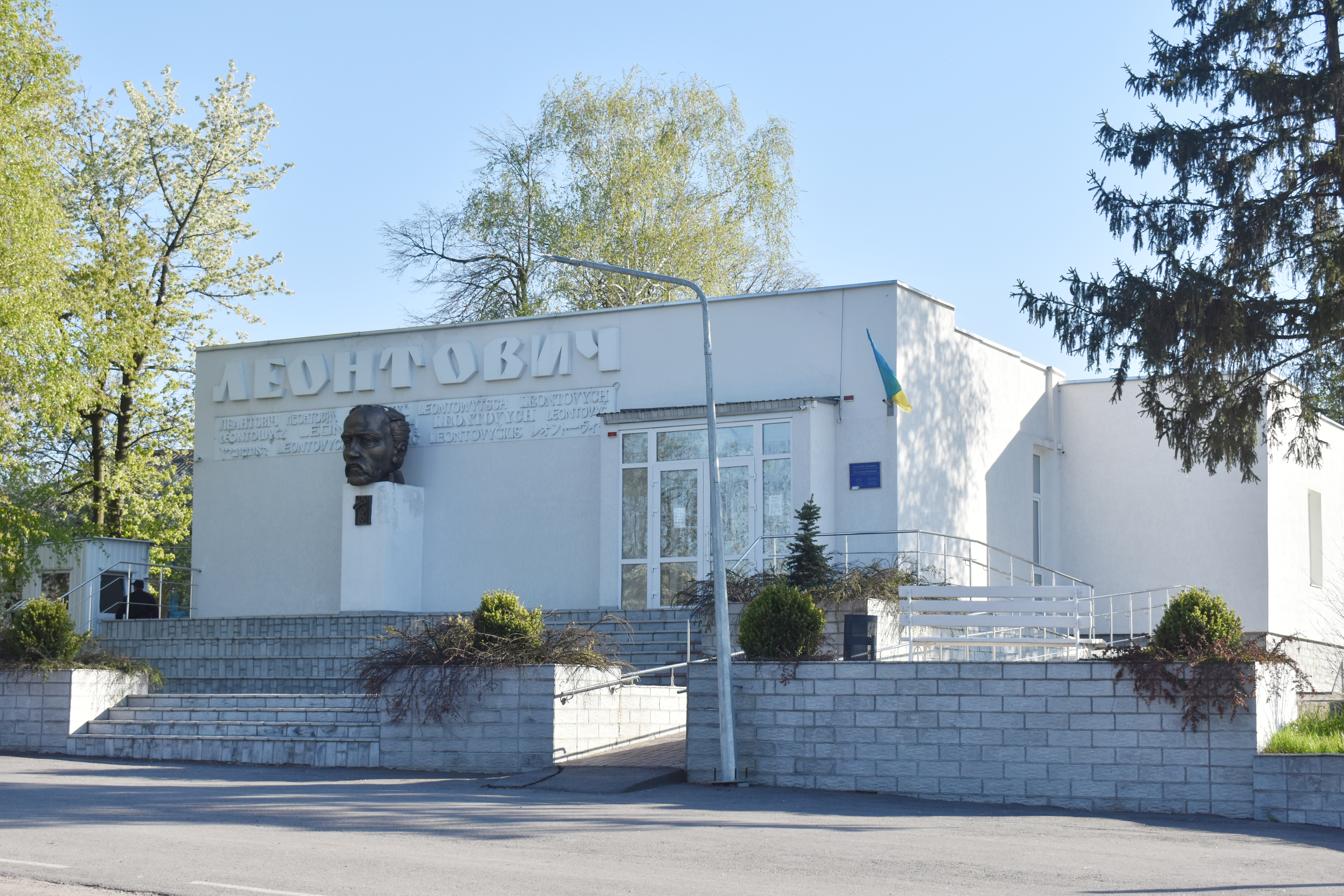
Mykola Leontovych Museum

== Exhibition ==
The modern exhibition is presented in 16 halls.

Nature Department

Hall №1

- Palaeogeographical map of Vinnytsia Oblast, fossilised remains of the Giant clam, samples of Shale, as well as Chalk, Opoka, and Rotten stone formed from the shells of marine organisms.

- Fragment of a reindeer antler, skulls of a bison, and a Woolly rhinoceros. There is a Mammoth skeleton found in 1961 near the village of Olhopil in Haisyn Raion.

- A collection of minerals formed by geologists Volodymyr Afanasyev, Yevhen Shmyrov, and Anatoliy Proskurko.

- Soil map of Vinnytsia Oblast.

Hall №2

- Map of vegetation distribution.

- Photograph of parks in Vinnytsia Oblast

- Medicinal plants

Hall №3

- Siskin, Woodpecker, Jay, Eurasian golden oriole, Magpie, Eurasian chaffinch, Common nightingale, Hare, Hedgehog, Muskrat, Common raccoon dog, Nutria, Deer, House sparrow, Jackdaw, Crow, Bullfinch, Hornet, Paper wasp, Weasel, Ferret, Badger, Long-eared owl, Marsh owl, Clanga, Pernis, Eurasian goshawk.

Hall №4

- Steppe Vegatation

- Zoogeographical map of Vinnytsia Oblast

- Eurasian griffon vulture (1923)

Hall №5

- Sculpture of a Neanderthal

- Late Paleolithic Flint tools - hand axes, cutters, sling.

- Fragments of Ceramic from the Buh–Dniester culture, a horn Hoe, flint Arrowhead, axes and Microlith.

- Horn, bone and stone hoes, Sickle, grain grinder, copper jewellery and tools from the Cucuteni–Trypillia culture.

- Clay spindles and a reconstructed Loom, figurines, binoculars and a model house.

Hall №6

- A Bronze Age Stele found by a burial mound near Porohiv in Mohyliv-Podilskyi Raion in 2011.

- Items from the burials of the Kurhan cemetery near Hordiivka, in Haisyn Raion. 40 burial minds were studied here from the 15th-10th Centuries BC. Many gold, bronze and amber ornaments were found, as well as bronze knifes, bronze and bone horse harnesses and clay pottery.

- Amber jewellery

- Reconstructed Bronze Age outfit

- Anklet

- Comb found in Nemyriv

- Scythian weapons, horse harnesses, utensils, necklaces, Acinaces, and a black lacquered Lekythos

- Arrowheads, pottery, and Amphora found near Porohiv.

- An iron knife, a brass archery ring, an arrowhead, a bronze bracelet, a bone tube, shell beads, glass, amber, Coral, Chalcedony, Carnelian, Agate, incense burners, Spindle (textiles) of the Sarmatians.

- Horn and metal combs, silver and bronze Fibula, a Black Sea necklace, and a glass cup from Moesia, all of the Chernyakhiv culture.

- A Slavic Jewellers workshop from the 6th Century AD.

- Jewellery found in Chervone, Haisyn Raion, Volyn style earrings, a Hryvnia, scales, a horse harness and weapons from the Kyivan Rus.

Hall №7

- Model of Vinnytsia Castles

- Items from a blacksmith's workshop of the 15th Century, a fragment of Chain mail, scissors, and a Koncerz

Hall №8

- Portrait of Severyn Nalyvaiko

- Map of the Cossack Uprisings of 1594

- Cossack weapons and pipes

- Map of military actions of Bohdan Khmelnytsky

- Diorama "The Defeat of the Polish troops by detachments of Cossacks and townspeople led by Ivan Bohun in Vinnytsia". 1969.

Hall №9

- A map of Right-bank Ukraine

- Reconstruction of the interior of a 19th Century Podolia Village House, household and utensils

Hall №10

- Materials on the French invasion of Russia, a map of Ukrainian regiments during the Russian counteroffensive, documents about the participation of the population of Podolia in battles against French troops, and the story of the Decembrist revolt.

- Crimean War

- Materials about the life and struggles of Ustym Karmaliuk.

- 19th Century craftsmens products, handwoven carpets, guild signs

- Charter of the landowner of Liubomyrka village (Haisyn Raion)

- Land ownership charters and agricultural tools included plows, and scythes.

- Reconstruction of a sugar factory dormitory

- Photograph of the Kyiv - Baltic railway

- Photographs of employees and workers of the Vinnytsia railway station.

- Passenger timetable of May 15, 1879

- Russian Empire banknotes

- Advertisements for the industrial and trading society "Meridian", which bred sugar beet seeds.

- Materials on the growth of Vinnytsia as an industrial, commercial and cultural centre of the oblast.

- Items from the daily life of nobles, townspeople, and peasants

- Women's costumes from the Early 20th Century.

- Contemporary furniture

- Phonograph

- Portraits and works of figures of science and culture of Vinnytsia Oblast.

- Exhibits to the Russian Revolution, World War I, the October Revolution and the participation of Podolian residents.

Hall №11

- Documents, photographs, leaflets, and newspapers of the formation of the Ukrainian People's Republic.

- Story of Mykhailo Hrushevsky

- Currency of the Ukrainian People's Republic, a rifle, a Carbine, a Mauser pistol, Sabre, a Tachanka, and a Maxim gun.

- Reconstruction of the office of the Military Department of the Ukrainian People's Republic.

Hall №12

- Food Tax campaign poster (1921)

- Reconstructed New Economic Policy era shop with irons, scarves, boots, fabrics, scythes, and samovars.

- Photographs of peasants of Vinnytsia Oblast

- Photographs of displaced peasants of Vinnytsia Oblast, personal belongings of the Hiliuk family from the village of Druzheliubivka in Khmilnyk Raion.

- Documents on Industrialisation in Vinnytsia Oblast including photographs showing the construction of the Vinnytsia Meat Processing Plant in 1931.

- A tractor from the Kharkiv Tractor Plant.

- Documents of the Sosonska Village Council in Vinnytsia Raion of the Holodomor.

- Memorial plaques of those who died during the Holodomor.

- Photographs, documents and personal belongings of repressed Podolians.

- Newspaper reports on excavations at mass grave sites in Vinnytsia Oblast in 1943.

- The gospel (1872), the Rosary, an Epitrachelion, and an 18th Century icon of the Last Supper.

- Development of Education and Theatre

Hall №13

- Vinnytsia Oblast during World War II

Hall №14

- Vinnytsia Oblast during World War II

Hall №15

- Vinnytsia Oblast in the Late 20th Century

Hall №16

- Materials from societies such as Prosvita and the Ukrainian Helsinki Group.

- Life of Liudmyla Karoyeva, cultured worker of Ukraine and director of the museum from 1992 - 2007.

- The Flag of Ukraine, first raised on Lenin Square in Vinnytsia on October 21, 1990.

- Photographs of destroyed businesses, food coupons, Ukrainian currency of the 1990s and a Kravchuchka.

- Agricultural products of Kryazh, LLC Agrofurm Olhopil, and Radivske.

- Maps, books, albums, magazines, atlases, globes and printed media from the State Cartographic Factory, JSC Vinnytsia Regional Printing House and LLC Podolia Publishing House.

- Scholars, cultural and artistic figures of Vinnytsia Oblast.

- Materials about the folk dance ensemble Barvinok.

- Pottery by Tetiana Shpak (b. 1947) and Liudmyla Filinska

- Samples of embroidery from Klembivka village in Mohyliv-Podilskyi Raion

- Sports of Vinnytsia Oblast

- "Elections" - exhibits, campaign materials and documents of political parties and organisations.

- Reconstruction of churches, spiritual revival and the life of religious communities in Vinnytsia Oblast.

Glory to the Heroes Exhibition

This exhibition was opened in March 18, 2014 and is dedicated to the fighters of the Maidan casualties who died during the Revolution of Dignity in Kyiv in January and February 2014.

The exhibition features leaflets, newspapers, documentary photos of national patriotic protests in Ukraine in 2013 and 2014 covering events in Vinnytsia and Kyiv.

- List of those killed and died from wounds of participants of the Revolution of Dignity on the Maidan.
