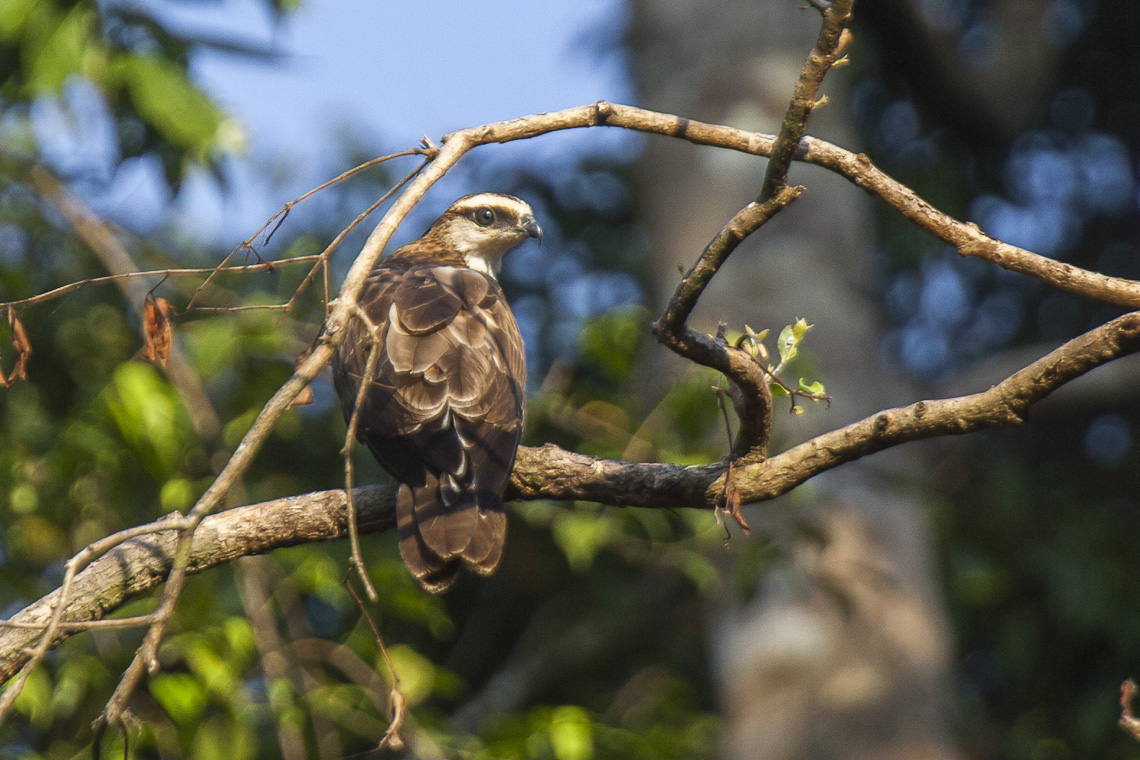

Conservation status
- Least Concern (IUCN 3.1)

Scientific classification
- Kingdom: Animalia
- Phylum: Chordata
- Class: Aves
- Order: Accipitriformes
- Family: Accipitridae
- Genus: Pernis
- Species: P. steerei

Binomial name
- Pernis steerei WL Sclater, 1919

Subspecies
- P. s. winkleri - Gamauf & Preleuthner, 1998; P. s. steerei - Sclater, WL, 1919

Synonyms
- Pernis celebensis winkleri Gamauf & Preleuthner, 1998

= Philippine honey buzzard =

Species of bird

The Philippine honey buzzard (Pernis steerei) is a species of bird of prey in the family Accipitridae. It is endemic to forested lowlands of the Philippines, with the exception of Palawan.

== Description ==
The body ranges from 52.5 cm to 55.3 cm in males and 52 cm to 59 cm in females; the wingspan is 2.1 times total length.

From above, the tail and broad rounded wings appear umber mingled with white; from below, both are pale and dark-banded, including a broad terminal band on the tail. The chest, belly and head are white and streaked, or pale to cream in juveniles. A dark brown crest extends from the back of the head and distinguishes P. steerei from P. celebensis, alongside paler plumage on the head and back. Eyes sport a bright golden iris in adults and a brown line running through from the beak to the back of the head. Raptorial dark grey beak and yellow legs, with claws averaging 20 to 22 cm. As expected from its short tarsus, narrow bill and square-cut tail, three indicators of foraging strategy, P. steerei is either seen perched upright on large branches or soaring.

Subspecies P. s. winkleri displays more typical raptorial sexual dimorphism than nominate P. s. steerei, as well as a juvenile-like homogenous brown plumage.

== Taxonomy ==
P. steerei is one of four species of honey-buzzards in Pernis. The common name of the genus likely stems from their diet of bee and wasp larvae.

Originally considered a subspecies of Pernis celebensis, the Philippine honey-buzzard was recently recognised as its own species in light of mitochondrial DNA evidence showing 3.3% genetic distance between the two birds. A split had been proposed even earlier, as authors noted the stark differences in plumage and geographic isolation between the barred and Philippine honey-buzzards. A previous subspecies of P. celebensis, P. c. winkleri, was simultaneously recognised as belonging under P. steerei alongside the nominal P. s. steerei.

A very short time saw P. steerei labelled Steere's honey-buzzard before Gamauf & Haring's split was popularised and, with it, the name Philippine honey-buzzard.

== Habitat & Distribution ==
The species is endemic to all Philippine islands barring Palawan. Individuals are typically seen in lowland primary or secondary rainforests from 90 to 1550 meter above sea level, favouring areas of high tree cover in which they can soar above the canopy; as these forests continue to undergo extensive logging, the species faces severe habitat loss.

The two subspecies are sedentary and geographically isolated, with winkleri observed in the northern islands (mainly Luzon, but also Polillo, Catanduanes, Marinduque, Sibuyan and Romblon) and steerei further south in Samar, Negros, Siargao, Mindanao, Basilan, Leyte, Tablas, Bohol, Tawitawi, Dinagat, Masbate and Panay.

This range is shared with two subspecies of the crested honey-buzzard; P. p. philippensis, a year-long resident, and winter visitor P. p. orientalis. Both can be distinguished from P. steerei by their red eyes and smaller to non-existent crests.

== Behaviour ==
=== Vocalizations ===
Honey-buzzards are generally quiet outside the breeding season, though one- or two-toned whistle-like calls are occasionally recorded.

=== Diet ===
As typical of a honey-buzzard, the diet of P. steerei mainly consists of wasp and bee larvae (or potentially pupae and adults), with regular additions of small nestlings, lizards and perhaps frogs. They hunt by soaring or sitting, perched on a large branch, waiting for prey; sister species P. celebensis is known to follow and catch hymenopterans in flight. Like their congeners, they armor themselves against retaliatory stings with dense, stiff plumage.

=== Reproduction ===
Two hiking researchers recorded a Philippine honey-buzzard in presumed display flight above the canopy in Panay, reporting a pattern similar to that of the European honey-buzzard. The describe the bird flying incrementally upwards from a soar, gaining 30 m vertically, where it would then extend its wings and repeatedly quiver them above its back, striking the tips together. The motion, characteristic of genus Pernis, held the honey-buzzard in the air for a short time, after which it would dive down sharply, wings kept close to its body, and repeat the entire maneuver twice more before returning to normal flight.

Little more is known of their reproductive behaviour, apart from eggs documented in February. Honey-buzzards typically time their brood so as to rear young in periods of high abundance in bees and wasps.

Sightings of P. celebensis and P. steerei include lone individuals and pairs. Couples are observed high-circling and talon-grasping.

== Habitat and conservation status ==
Its natural habitat is moist tropical primary lowland forest and montane forest up to 2,000 meters above sea level but is most often seen below 1,400 meters.

The IUCN has assessed this species as least concern, the population is believed to be declining due to deforestation from land conversion, Illegal logging and slash-and-burn farming. This species also experiences hunting pressure for both meat and the pet trade.
