= Gustav Briling =

Ukrainian Historian and Artist

- Born: February 21, 1867; Barysaw, Barysaw District, Russian Empire
- Died: 1942 (aged 74–75); Probably Novopskov, Voroshylovhrad Oblast Oblast, Ukrainian SSR
- Education: Nemyriv Boy's Gymnasium, Taras Shevchenko National University of Kyiv
- Occupations: Historian, Artist, Ethnographer, Lawyer
- Years active: 1894–1940

Gustav Voldemarovych Briling (February 21, 1867–1942) was a Ukrainian historian, lawyer, artist and ethnographer. He was a co-founder and director of the Vinnytsia Museum of Local History and a member of the Podolia Provincial Committee for the Protection of Art, Antiques and Natural Monuments in 1922. He was also an author of memoirs and testimonies about the Holodomor of 1932–1933.

== Biography ==
Briling was born in 1867 in the Belarusian city of Barysaw into a family of a land surveyor. His father died when Briling was at a young age, and his mother moved the family to her parents house in Podolia. Briling studied at the Nemyriv Boy's Gymnasium in Nemyriv, where he graduated in 1889.

Briling enrolled at the Faculty of Law at Taras Shevchenko National University of Kyiv in 1890, when he also attended the private art school of Mykola Murashko — a well known Kyiv artist.

Briling graduated from university in 1894, and was sent to Kostroma, where he worked at the district court as an acting judicial investigator. He worked there for five years, and was transferred to Plyos, Ivanovo Oblast as a judicial investigator in 1899.

Briling returned to Vinnytsia in 1907, where he was a law teacher at a Real school, a court investigator of the first district court, and the vice commander of the yacht club "Sport", established in Spring 1910 by Vyacheslav Korenev. Briling established the youth sports centre of Vinnytsia for students of the school and boys from Zamość, residents of Jerusalem, and peasants of the suburbs.

From 1913 to 1919, Briling worked as a judicial investigator in Pyriatyn and Lubny, both in Poltava Governorate.

Briling was a member of the Podolia Society for the Protection of Historical and Cultural Monuments of Art and Antiques, which was granted the premises of the Vinnytsia Walls in May 1914 and was allocated funding. 460,000 UAH was allocated to the museum in 1919 by the Ukrainian People's Republic. The museum was co-founded by Briling, and was opened in the apartment of V. F. Korenev in May 1919. Briling organized a thorough description of the museum collection, a restoration of artistic and ethnographic artifacts, manuscripts and books, as well as working on illustrated albums of Podolia pysanky, embroidered shirts and carpet weaving. The museum collection numbered about 10,000 by 1928.

Briling was arrested in December 1933 on charges of spying for Nazi Germany as part of the fictitious "Ukrainian Military Organization". Briling was released five months later due to lack of evidence. Following his release, he worked as an art consultant, and expanded the museum collection with embroidery, carpets and a valuable album of drawings by Stefan Norblin de la Gourdaine and Volodymyr Orlovsky.

Briling was arrested a second time in 1940 for his memoirs, where the following were confiscated:

- "Memories of the Vinnytsia Musuem" - 125p.
- "Life Summary - Public" - 17 notebooks, 568p.
- "Life Summary" - 6 notebooks of 270 pages.
- "My Diary" - January-March 1940. 109 pages.

Briling was convicted under Article 54-10 part 1 of the Criminal Code of the Ukrainian SSR to 4 years of imprisonment by the Vinnytsia Regional Court on June 21, 1940. Briling died on the way from a concentration camp in Starobilsk in Voroshylovhrad Oblast into Russia.

Briling's son - Valentyn saught his father's rehabilitation in 1956 with his brother Heorhiy, and again in February 1988 at 81 years old. The verdict of 1940 was annulled by Resolution of the Supreme Court of Ukraine on August 26, 1988.

== Personal life ==
Briling had two sons - Heorhiy and Valentyn. Heorhiy researched Jewish heritage of Vinnytsia, including photographing carved tombstones in the Jewish Cemetery of Nemyriv, and collected Jewish art for the museum.
