= Pernis =

Pernis may refer to:

- Pernis (bird), a genus of honey-buzzards in the Perninae subfamily
- Pernis, Netherlands, a neighborhood of Rotterdam, Netherlands
- Pernis (station), a metro station in Pernis, Rotterdam
