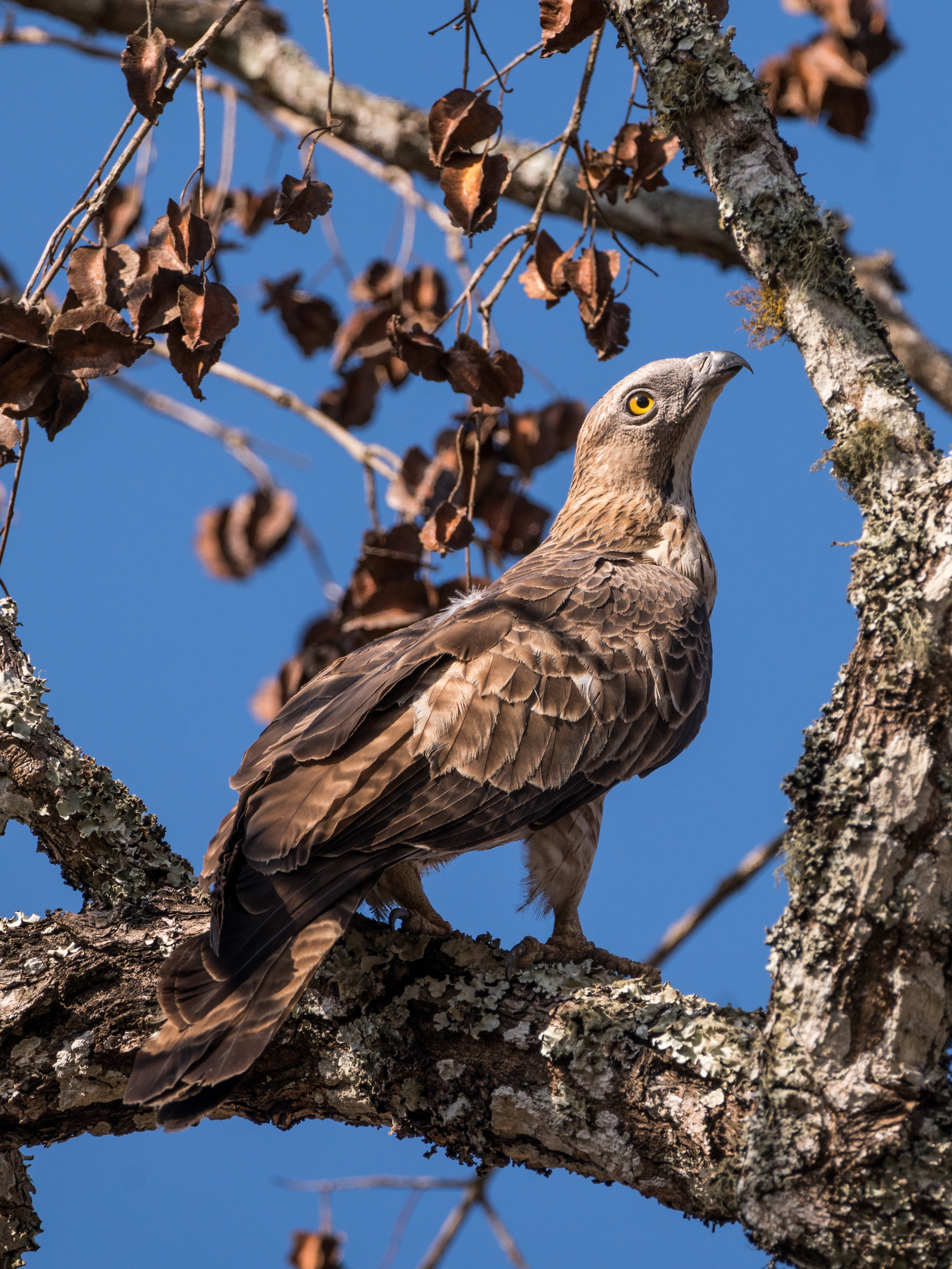
- Female in Mudumalai, India

Conservation status
- Least Concern (IUCN 3.1)

Scientific classification
- Kingdom: Animalia
- Phylum: Chordata
- Class: Aves
- Order: Accipitriformes
- Family: Accipitridae
- Genus: Pernis
- Species: P. ptilorhynchus

Binomial name
- Pernis ptilorhynchus (Temminck, 1821)
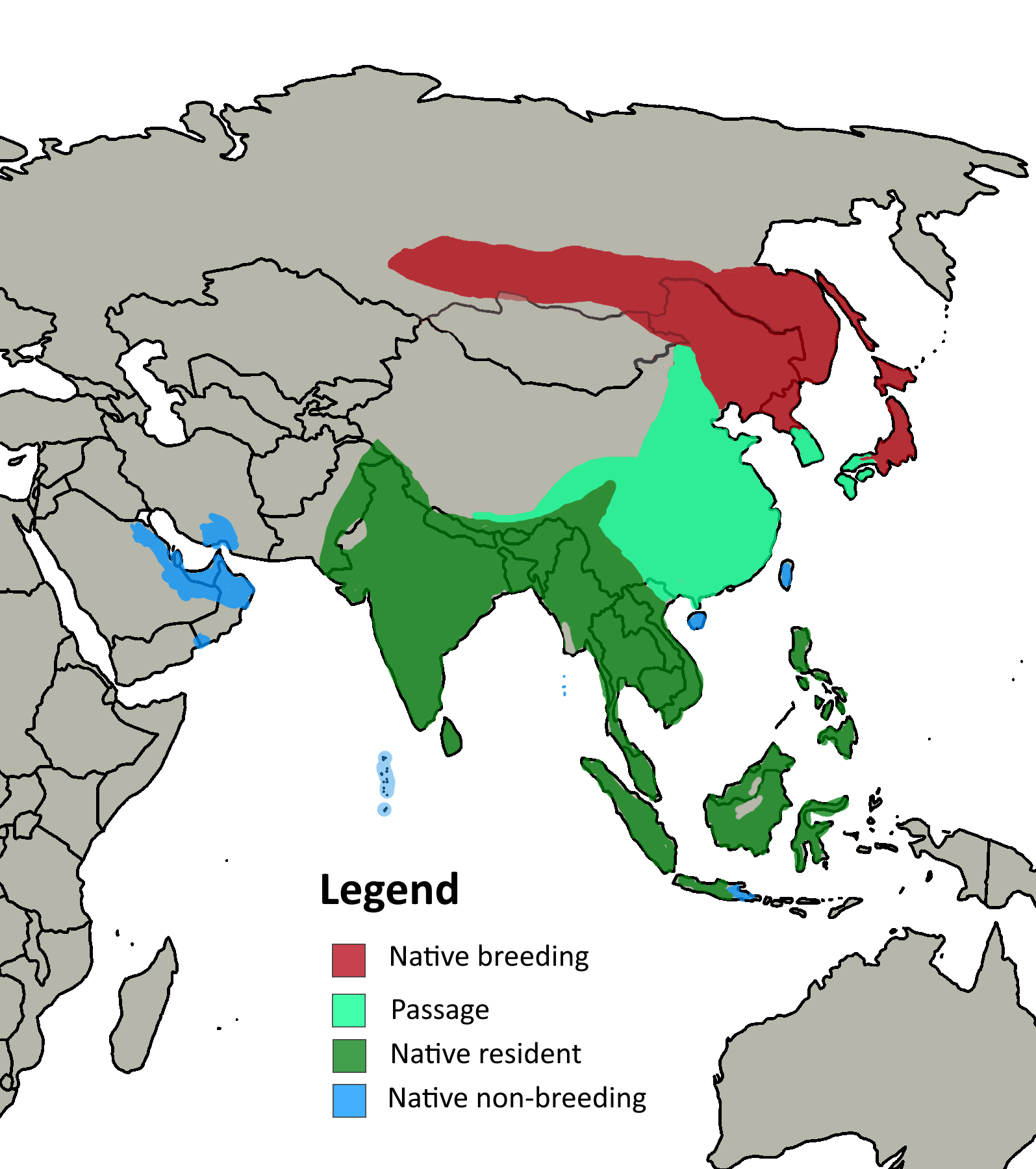
- Red: Native breeding, Light green: Passage, Dark green: Native resident, Blue: Native non-breeding

Synonyms
- Falco ptilorhynchus Temminck, 1821; Falco ptilorhyncus Temminck, 1822

= Crested honey buzzard =

Species of bird

The crested honey buzzard (Pernis ptilorhynchus), also known as the Oriental, Asiatic, or Eastern honey buzzard, is a bird of prey in the family Accipitridae, which also includes many other diurnal raptors such as kites, eagles, and harriers. It is a fairly large raptor, larger than the European honey buzzard. The name honey buzzard is derived from their diets, which consist mainly of the larvae of bees and wasps extracted from honey combs. It is sexually dimorphic and has six subspecies.

Crested honey buzzards migrate for breeding to Siberia and Japan during the summer. They then spend the winter in Southeast Asia and the Indian subcontinent. They are also a year-round resident in these latter areas. They prefer well-forested areas with open spaces and are found from sea level up to 1,800 m (5,900 ft).

The species has several adaptations for its specialist diet. These include an elongated head for foraging on underground nests and a groove in the tongue for extracting wasp grubs from their comb cells. A mass of short, dense feathers on the head and neck protect against stinging attacks by social wasps. Juveniles may have adopted Batesian mimicry to deter predators.

== Taxonomy ==
The crested honey buzzard was obtained from the island of Java by the Dutch zoologist C.J. Temminck. He depicted and named it as Falco ptilorhynchus in March 1821. Temminck's later text description submitted to the Bibliothèque Nationale in July 1823 used the spelling ptilorhyncus. Later, in 1839, Temminck used the spelling ptilorhynchus in the Tableau Méthodique. Both Temminck's spellings have been used, for example Salim Ali used -cus while Grimmett and others used -chus. Recently Dickinson and others have argued that the original spelling -chus must stand.

The British Museum Catalogue of Accipitres published in 1874 by R. Bowdler Sharpe lists the names Falco ptilorhynchus (attributed to Temminck, 1823) and Pernis ptilorhynchus (attributed to J.F. Stephens, 1826). Sharpe was perhaps unaware that Temminck's early illustrations had scientific names on the wrappers of the parts (livraisons) of his work and he cited Temminck's later works. In 1874, the British Museum had 18 specimens of the crested honey buzzard and its Catalogue listed nine different species names of genus Pernis for these.

The crested honey buzzard (Pernis ptilorhynchus) includes six subspecies, which are shown in the table below.

Subspecies of Pernis ptilorhynchus.
Scientific name	Authority	Breeding range
P. p. orientalis	Taczanowski, 1891	South Siberia to NE China and Japan
P. p. ruficollis	Lesson, R, 1830	India and Sri Lanka to Myanmar, Vietnam and SW China
P. p. torquatus	Lesson, R, 1830	Malay Peninsula, Sumatra and Borneo
P. p. ptilorhynchus	(Temminck, 1821)	Java
P. p. palawanensis	Stresemann, 1940	Palawan group (SW Philippines)
P. p. philippensis	Mayr, 1939	Philippines (except Palawan group and Sulu Archipelago)

Despite its name, the crested honey buzzard is not related to Buteo buzzards, and is taxonomically closer to the kites.

== Description ==
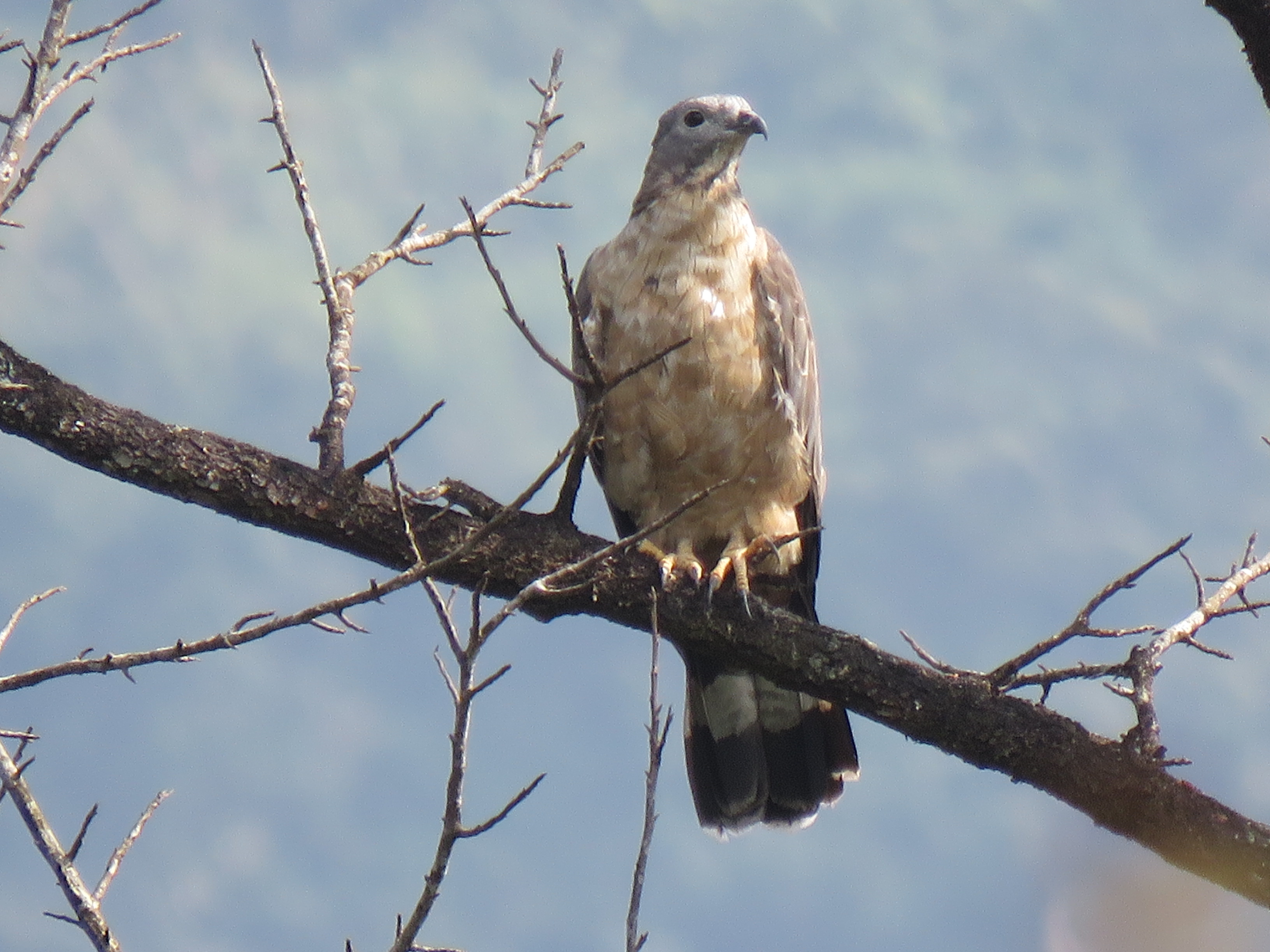
Front view of male, Valparai, Tamil Nadu, India

About 57–60 cm (22–24 in) in size, the crested honey buzzard is a fairly large raptor. The bird weighs 750 to 1,490 g (1.65 to 3.28 lb). The head lacks a strong superciliary ridge, giving it a facial appearance very unlike a raptor. It appears long-necked with a small head resembling that of a pigeon. It has a long tail and a short head crest. It is brown above, but not as dark as the European honey buzzard, and paler below. A dark throat stripe is present. Unusually for a large bird of prey, the sexes can be distinguished. The male has a blue-grey head with brown iris, while the female's head is brown and the iris is yellow. She is slightly larger and darker than the male. The male has two black bands in the tail and three black under wing bands, while the female has three black tail bands and four narrower black under wing bands. The juvenile has extensive black primary tips with narrower underwing bands. It has a yellow cere at the base of the bill, and a dark iris. The colouration and the tail pattern of the species are highly variable.

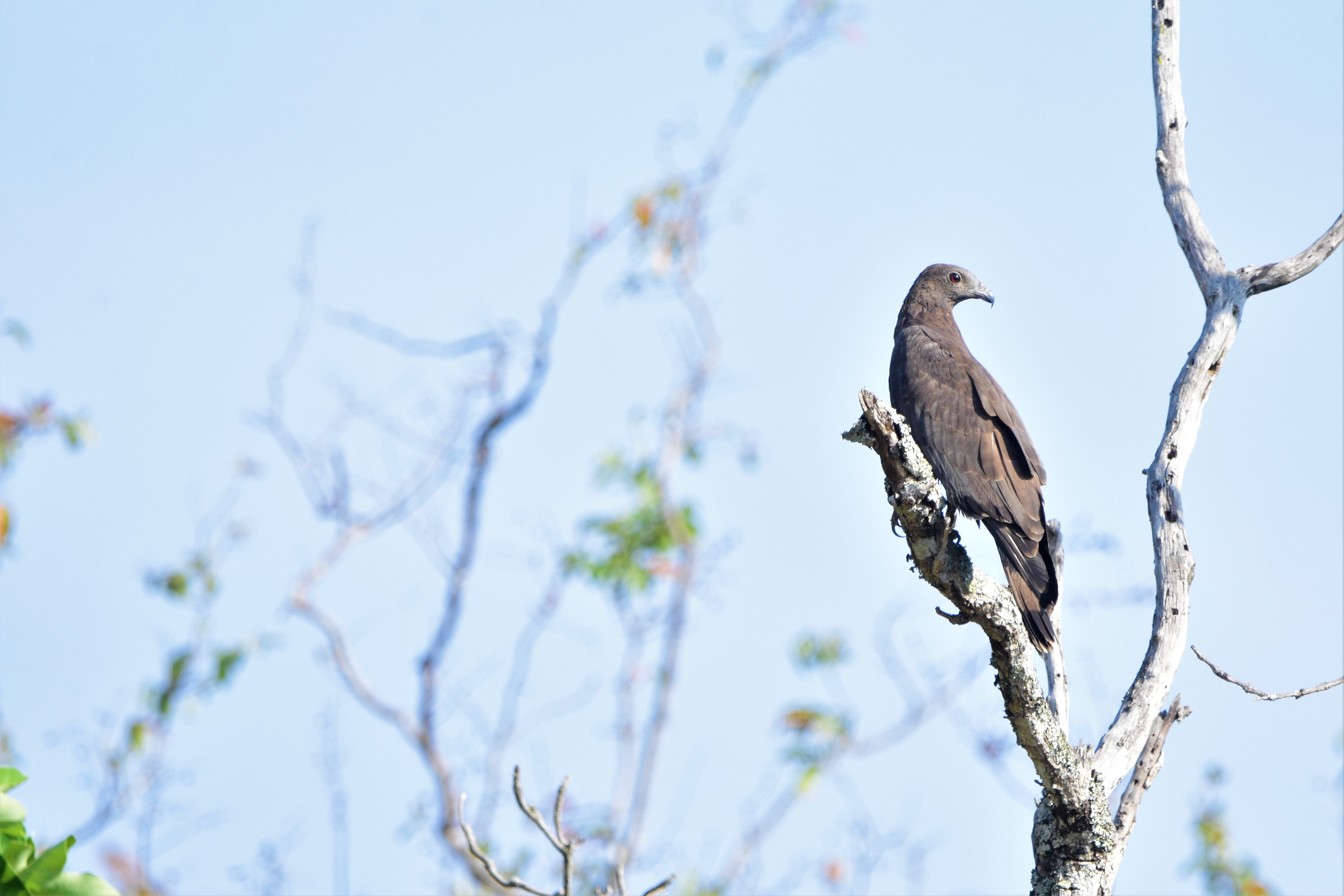
Oriental Honey Buzzard (dark morph), Bandipur National Park, India

In flight, it is likely to be mistaken at a distance for the short-toed snake-eagle. However, it can be distinguished by its slimmer head and longer neck. It is usually seen soaring singly or in pairs, or it may be perched on a tree top. It is quiet even while nesting, sometimes uttering a single high-pitched screaming whistle. In flight it has deep elastic beats and high upstrokes. It glides and soars on flat or slightly arched wings at right angles to the body. The long broad wings are well rounded at six-fingered tips. The tail is broad, of medium length with a rounded tip. The tail is shorter than the breadth of the wing bases. The wing span is 2.4 times total length in the Palearctic (Eurasian) subspecies, but 2.0–2.2 in the Indo-Malayan subspecies.

Structure of a feather showing interlocking barbules

The similarity in plumage between juvenile crested honey buzzards and the Nisaetus hawk-eagles may have arisen as a partial protection against predation by larger raptors. The eagles have stronger bills and talons, and are likely to be less vulnerable than the Pernis species. Similar mimicry is shown by the juvenile of the European honey buzzard, which resembles the common buzzard. Although the Eurasian Goshawk is capable of killing both species, it is likely to be more cautious about attacking the better protected Buteo species. These are examples of Batesian mimicry, named after the English naturalist and explorer H.W. Bates who first reported such mimicry in the context of Lepidoptera (moths and butterflies) in 1861.

== Distribution and habitat ==
The crested honey buzzard is a summer migrant to Siberia and Korea, Japan, wintering in tropical Southeast Asia and the Indian subcontinent. It leaves Siberia in late August and returns in May. The summer sojourn in Japan is April–May to mid-September. Elsewhere, it is more or less resident. Crested honey buzzards that migrate from breeding areas in Japan to wintering areas in Southeast Asia fly over the East China Sea. This 700 km (430 mi) nonstop flight over water is possible because during autumn, winds over the sea blow in the same direction as the birds' direction of flight (i.e. wind support). In Europe, the crested honey buzzard has been documented in Italy in 2011, in Cyprus in 2012, at the Strait of Messina, and in Lesvos, Greece in 2018.

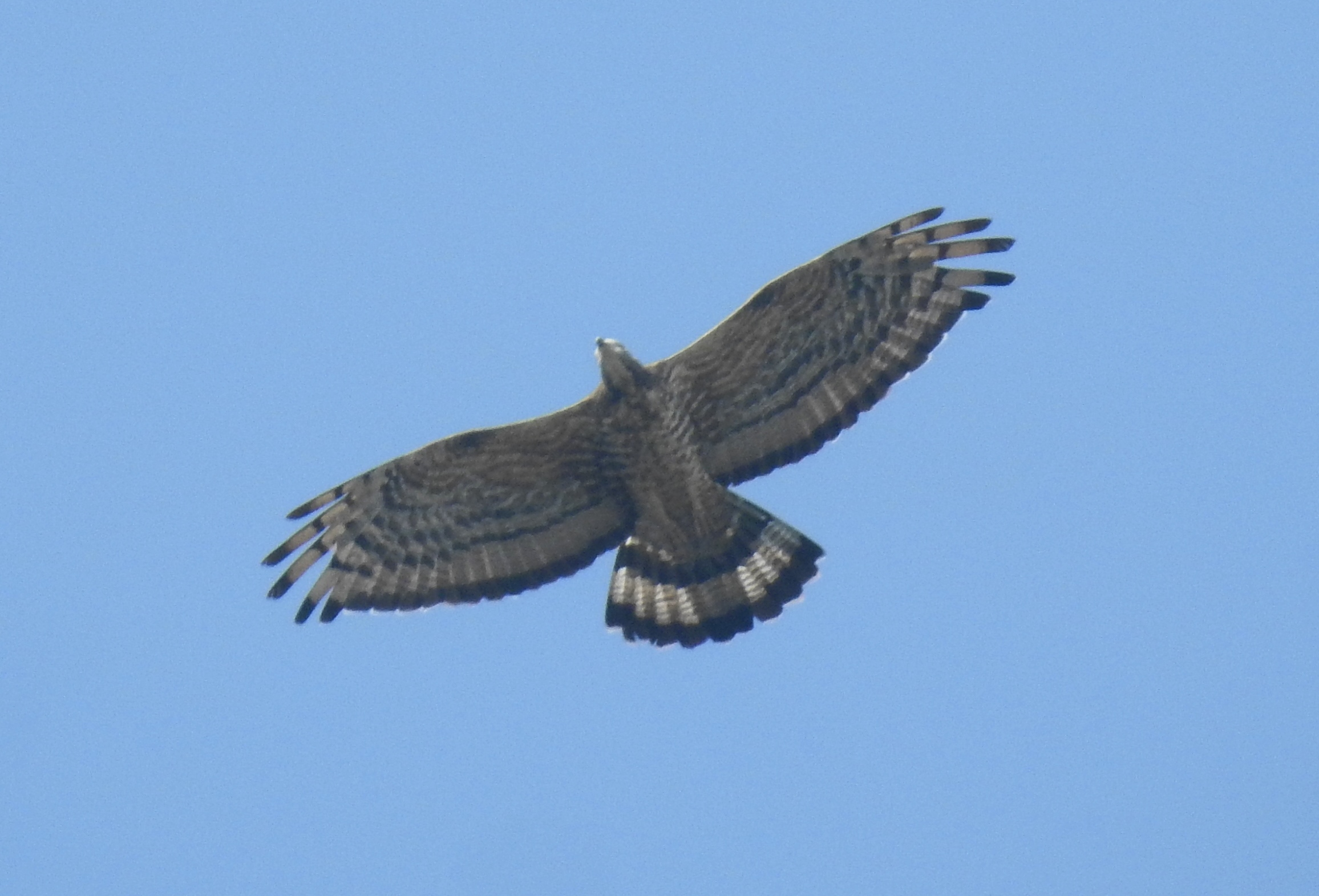
P. p. ruficollis
Maharashtra, India

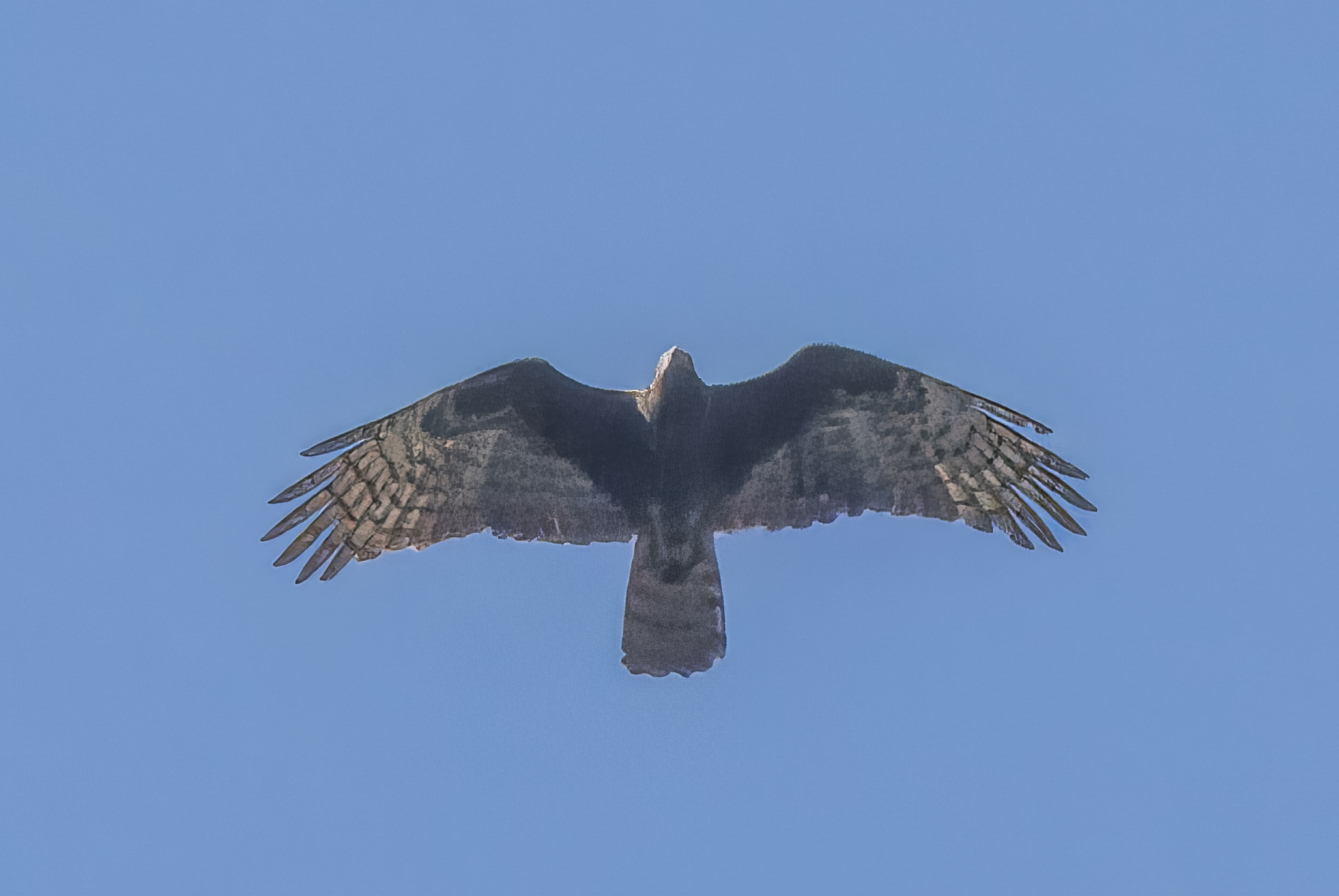
P. p. orientalis
Yangmingshan, Taiwan

It has been recorded on the Alaskan island of Shemya. This record is the first known occurrence of this species in North America, and the individual photographed represents the subspecies P. p. orientalis.

The crested honey buzzard prefers well-forested lowland and hilly areas that are broken by open glades. In South and Southeast Asia it is sometimes found in small groves near villages. It is found from sea level to 1,500 m (4,900 ft), occasionally up to 1,800 m (5,900 ft). During migrations it goes above 3,000 m (9,800 ft).

== Behaviour and ecology ==
Roller coaster display of Pernis species

=== Diet ===
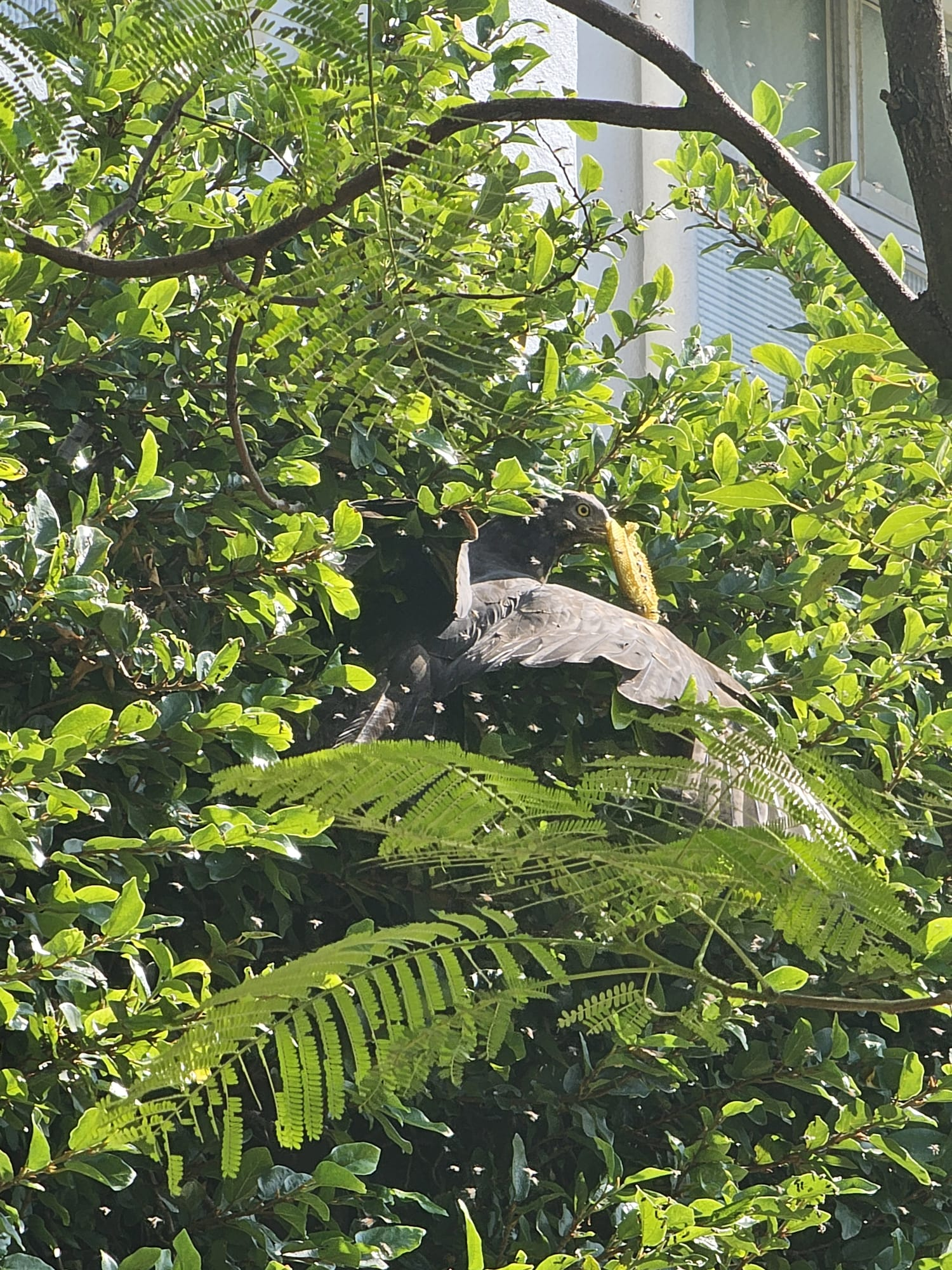
Oriental Honey Buzzard with honeycomb in Kaohsiung, Taiwan

The crested honey buzzard is a specialist feeder, living mainly on the larvae of social bees and wasps, and eating bits of comb and honey. It takes other small insect prey such as cicadas. It occasionally eats small birds, reptiles and frogs like other raptors.

=== Breeding ===
The crested honey buzzard breeds in woodland, and is inconspicuous except in the spring, when the mating display includes wing clapping. The display of roller coasting in flight and fluttering wings at the peak of the ascent are characteristic of the genus Pernis. It is as yet uncertain whether the roller coaster display is related to courtship. The breeding season in the migratory range is June to mid-September for central Siberia and April to August in Japan. In India, it is April–June, though it starts in February in South India.

The nest is a platform of sticks 40–80 cm (16–31 in) across, lined with dry or green leaves. It is located at a height of 10–28 m (33–92 ft) in conifers in the north, and 6–20 m (20–66 ft) in banyan, mango, casuarina or coconut in India. The female normally lays two eggs. The colour is variable, ranging from pale cream to chestnut brown. Incubation takes 4–5 weeks, the chicks are fledged in 5–6 weeks and they become independent after a further 58 weeks. Male and female share the responsibilities of rearing the young.

=== Adaptations for diet ===
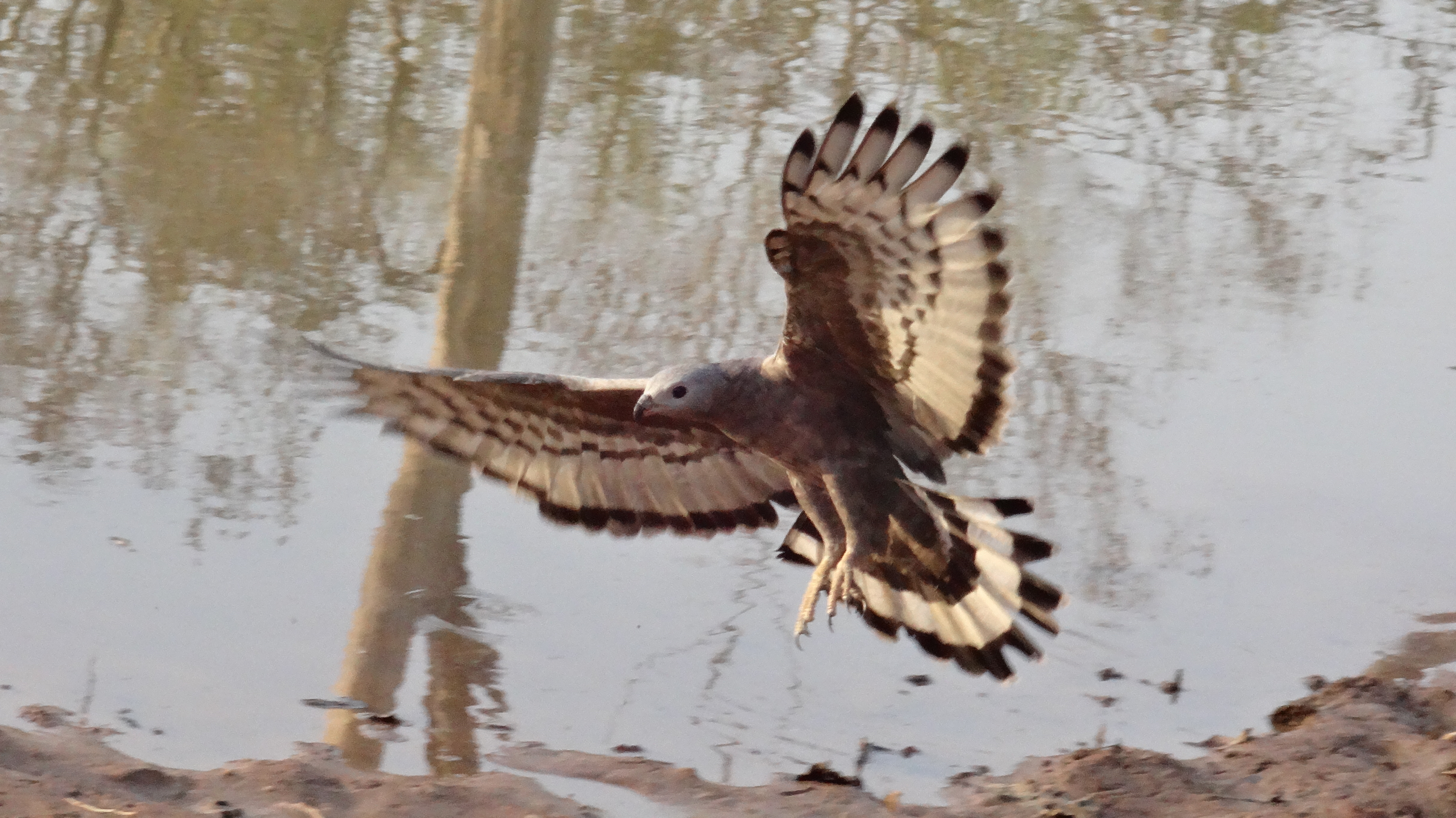
Taking off after drinking at a pond, Bandhavgarh, India

Unlike most of their relatives, crested honey buzzards prefer a diet of the larvae, pupae and honey combs of social wasps. In their summer breeding grounds in Japan, the birds dig up underground social wasp nests with their talons. The short toe depth and long talon on the second digit facilitate this behaviour. In addition, the long slender beak with a hooked tip, and the eyes set far back, are adaptations well suited for foraging in underground nests. The tongue has a groove adapted for extracting larvae from the honey comb. In the wintering regions in South Asia, crested honey buzzards are observed attacking social wasp nests in trees.

When foraging both underground and arboreal nests, the birds have to contend with stinging attacks by wasps. The feathers around the head and neck are well suited to repelling attacks. A study in 2016 by a British and a Japanese researcher compared the head and neck feathers of crested honey buzzards with those of the black kite (Milvus migrans) and grey-faced buzzard (Butastur indicus). These are similar raptors, but only the honey buzzard forages on wasp nests. The researchers found significant adaptations of the feathers. The honey buzzard has a dense mat of short feathers under its beak, around its eyes and nostrils and on its neck with barbules closer together. They are stiffer with more hooks and nodes for barbules to attach to one another, yielding an armour like appearance. In the other kites, the feathers are longer and softer, with fewer barbules towards the tips. Thus, more of the skin is exposed. The head and neck feathers of the crested honey buzzard are shorter, being only 50–70% the length of the feathers in the other two species.

The crested honey buzzard may have also evolved a chemical defense. Its feathers were observed to have a white filamentous covering that is not present in black kites and grey-faced buzzards. Videos indicate that social wasps attack bears and other mammals more than they attack honey buzzards. Experiments indicate that the substance from the wings of honey buzzards renders wasps inactive. However, this is as yet speculative and the composition of the substance is yet to be determined. In a wasp attack on two crested honey buzzards observed in Japan, the wasps mainly attacked the head and neck. Their stings were about 1 mm (0.039 in) in size. Most of the stings were embedded in the dense mat of feathers. A few stings pierced the skin where feathers were missing. Thus, the feather adaptations provided partial protection against wasp attacks.

== Threats and conservation ==
The IUCN status of the crested honey buzzard is least concern. The bird is inconspicuous and may be undercounted, except during migration. Rough estimates of the population range from 100,000 to 1,000,000.

As climate change affects wind conditions worldwide, the wind support for migration over the 680 km (420 mi) migratory pathway over the East China Sea could be reduced. Japanese researchers have developed a mathematical model to estimate the effect of climate change on the favourable winds over this section. They predict a slight reduction in the migratory areas due to this wind change effect by the middle of the 21st century and a complete loss of the migratory pathway by late in the century. The study does not consider possible behavioural adaptations of migratory birds which could possibly compensate for the changing wind patterns.

On the positive side, the species appears to be adapting to the availability of anthropogenic habitats. It has colonized irrigated forest plantations in some areas of Pakistan. It has recently spread to the Middle East and regularly winters in small numbers in Arabia. These birds may be migrating from Siberia using a pathway over Kazakhstan and Uzbekistan that is west of the Himalayas.

Falconry as a hobby in Indonesia started in the 1970s. As Facebook is popular in Indonesia, it is used for the illegal sale of raptors. Two studies of a number of Facebook groups were conducted during 2015. In both studies combined, the total number of birds offered for sale was about 10,000. The most popular raptors were black-winged kite and changeable hawk eagle, accounting for about 39% of the 10,000. In contrast, crested honey buzzards accounted for only about 1%.

== In culture ==
In the island of Java in Indonesia, people living in or near forested areas suffer from attacks, sometimes fatal, by giant honey bees. The local people and honey collectors blame the honey buzzards for these attacks. This raptor attacks the nests of the giant honey bee. As it flies away with a piece of the honeycomb in its claws, it is pursued by angry bees. The local belief is that as its escape strategy the honey buzzard flies close to humans in the vicinity to transfer the attack of the angry bees to the humans. However, in a study of the hunting behaviour of honey buzzards conducted between 2003 and 2019, no evidence of this strategy was observed by the researchers. They surmised that a decline in the habitat due to human activity has increased the conflict between bees and humans.
