= Vyacheslav Korenev =

Ukrainian Artist

Vyacheslav Fedorovych Korenev
- В'ячеслав Федорович Коренев
- Born: September 9, 1868; Novorossiysk, Krasnodar Krai, Russian Empire
- Died: December 5, 1928 (aged 60); Shumen, Bulgaria
- Education: Odesa Drawing School, Imperial Academy of Arts
- Occupation: Artist
- Years active: 1896–1920
- Employer: Vinnytsia Musuem of Local History

Vyacheslav Korenev (September 9, 1868–December 5, 1928) was a Ukrainian painter and one of the founders of the Vinnytsia Musuem of Local History.

== Biography ==
Korenev was born in the city of Novorossiysk in Krasnodar Krai, Russia, to a Lieutenant colonel of Odesa. He studied at the Odesa Drawing School from 1886-1889, and graduated from the Imperial Academy of Arts in 1894. He was a talented marine painter and became a member of the Society of South Russian Artists and the Turkish Union of Artists in the Russian Federation in 1893. Korenev travelled to the Far East during the 1890s including to Japan from 1894 to 1896, getting work as a sailor.

Korenev moved to Vinnytsia in 1896, where he designed and built an Art Nouveau house for himself. He taught at the Vinnytsia Real school from 1896 until the February Revolution in 1917. Korenev opened a studio in 1907. He also created a student yacht club "Sport" in Vinnytsia in Spring 1910. The funds for this club were provided by local patrons Count Z. Hrokholsky and landowner I. Shchenkovsky, as well as students' parents. A swimming dock, a buffet tent, a croquet court and a gymnastics court were built.

Korenev received the Grand Gold Medal at the Kyiv All-Russian Exhibition in 1913 for creating the Sport Yacht Club. He was sent to war in the World War I and was wounded. He returned to Vinnytsia after the war and lived at Pushkinska Street, 19. He became a co-founder and the first director of the Vinnytsia Musuem of Local History on May 14, 1918. He moved to Romania in 1919, and Bulgaria in 1920, where he was an art teacher at the Varna Gymnasium in Varna.

== Works ==
- "Surf in the Mediterranean Sea" - 1896
- "Old Genoese Fortress in Sudak"
- "Morning at Odesa Port"
- "The Bank of Alupka" - 1900
- "Yevhen Bukovetskyi" - 1900
- "Park"
- "Pier"
- "Lane in Alupka"
- "Pumpkins" - 1905
- "Venice Pier" - 1907
- "Monastery Wall" - 1908
- "Autumn Landscape" - 1908
- "Seashore" - 1908
- "A. Manievich" - 1908
- "Arched Bridge over the Canal" - 1909
- "Landscape" - 1910
- "Near the Simonov Monastery" - 1910

Some works are preserved in the Odesa Fine Arts Museum and the Vinnytsia Art Musuem.
