= Stepan Slobodianiuk-Podolian =

Ukrainian Artist

Stepan Ivanovych Slobodianiuk-Podolian
- Born: August 2, 1876; Lityn, Podolia Governorate, Russian Empire
- Died: September 15, 1932 (aged 56); Leningrad, Russian SFSR
- Citizenship: Ukraine
- Occupation: Artist
- Years active: 1899–1930

Stepan Ivanovych Slobodianiuk-Podolian (August 2, 1876 - September 15, 1932) was a Ukrainian artist.

== Biography ==
Slobodianiuk-Podolian was born on August 2, 1876, in Lityn, Podolia Governorate (now Vinnytsia Oblast). He studied at the Grekov Odesa Art School from 1899 to 1901 and the Imperial Academy of Arts in Saint Petersburg from 1905 to 1912.

He lived at 6th Line Street, 37 on Vasilyevsky Island in Saint Petersburg.

From 1921 to 1923, he was the director of the Vinnytsia Art Museum. He moved to Katerynoslav in 1925, where he founded the Dnipropetrovsk Art School. From 1929 he worked in Novomoskovsk.

Slobodianiuk-Podolian died on September 15, 1932, in Leningrad.

== Works ==
- Storm and Calm: Karmaliuk's Funeral (1912)
- Portrait of a Woman (1915)
- Sailor of the cruiser Aurora (1917)
- Ukrainian Girl (1926)
- Karmaliuk (1926)
- Moldovanka (1928)
- Portrait of a Steelworker (1930)
- Obzhinki
- Free Ukraine

The works are kept in the Dnipro Art Museum.
