= Vinnytsia Walls =

City wall in Vinnytsia

- Вінницькі Мури
- Interactive map of Vinnytsia Walls
- Location: Vinnytsia, Ukraine
- Coordinates: 49°13′55″N 28°28′31″E
- Type: Wall
- Material: Brick
- Beginning date: 1611
- Completion date: 1617

The Vinnytsia Walls are a complex of defensive and monastic buildings from the 17th Century in Vinnytsia, Ukraine. It consisted of buildings and walls of a Jesuit Monastery, a Jesuit church, a collegium, as well as a Dominican monastery and church. The buildings are surrounded by fortress walls with Buttresses and towers. The walls were built in the 17th Century by Jesuit monks.

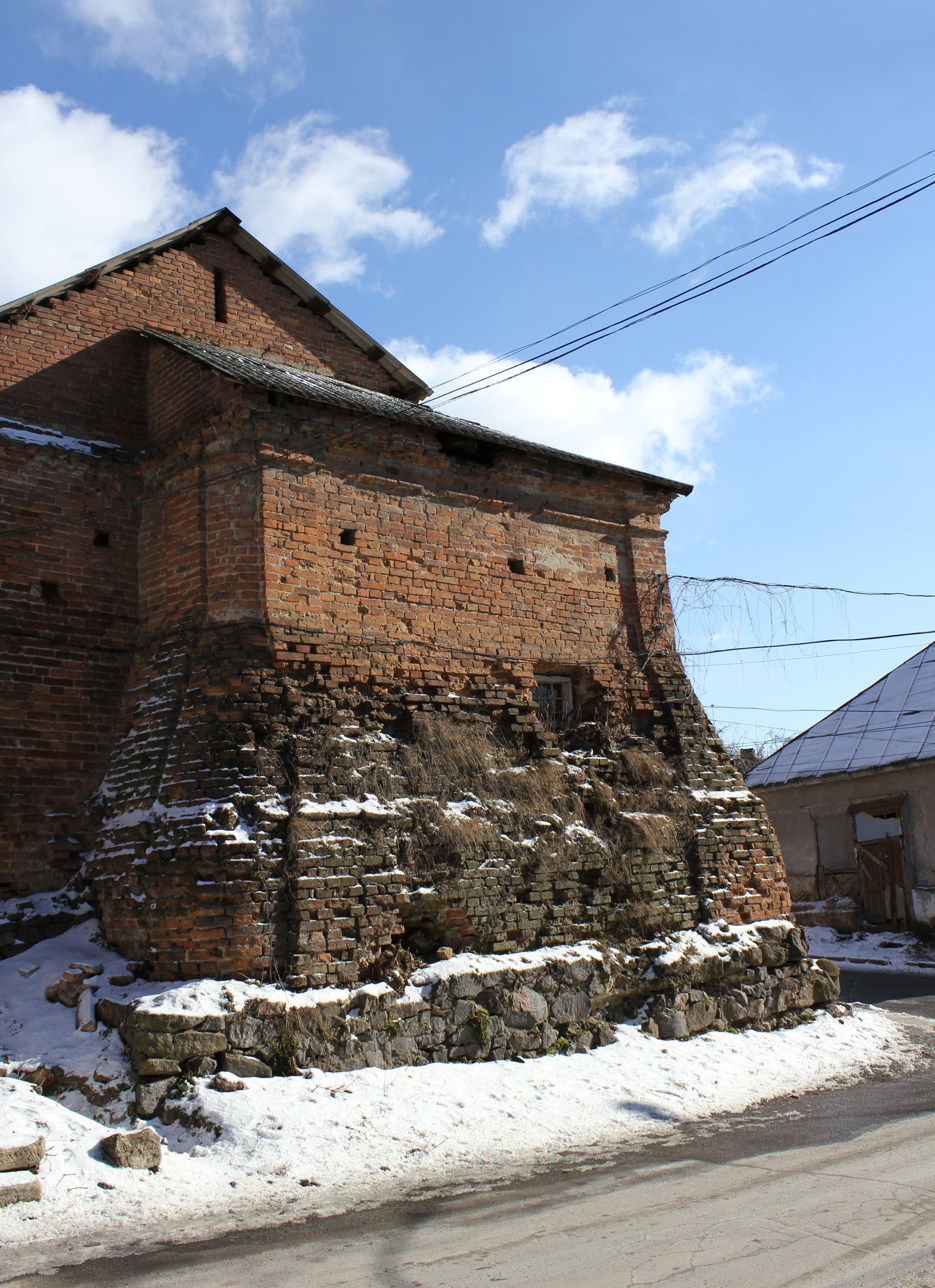
The corner tower of the walls

== History ==
The Vinnytsia Starosta Walenty Kalinowski granted the Jesuits his legal office in Vinnytsia for the construction of the monastery in 1611 and assigned them the farmstead of Kaidachykha and the village of Kazanykha. From 1619 the Jesuits had a permanent residence in Vinnytsia. They built a stone monastery in the 1630s and a church in the 1830s. Fortress walls were built due to the threat of Tatar and Cossack raids.

Within the Jesuit Walls, a prison, a treasury, warehouses, courts, military units, a hospital, a fire station, a church, an almshouse, a printers, a pawnshop and a newspaper office was housed.

Following the Russian Revolution, the complex became a centre of culture in Vinnytsia. A branch of the Vernadsky National Library of Ukraine was housed here during the 1920s, the Pedagogical Institute and the Ukrainian Autocephalous Church during the 1920s and 1930s. The Vinnytsia Art Musuem, the State Archives of Vinnytsia Oblast, the Vinnytsia Musuem of Local History, and the Vinnytsia Technical Lyceum are also located here.

The walls and Jesuit College in the Mid 19th Century

== Walls ==
The large church, collegium and dormitory began to be built by Jesuit Monks in 1610. They were surrounded by a wall in 1617 when the name "Mury" was established. The Southern part of the wall was demolished in the 1870s. Part of the wall collapsed in 1891, but the premises were renovated in 1901, and in 1907 during adaption as a boys gymnasium, and again in 1911 when a girls gymnasium was created .

Only the Southwest corner tower with the southern and western walls remain. The tower is brick, square in plan, with rounded corners, single-tiered, on a high plinth, reinforced with buttresses and covered with vaults. They are made of large red bricks on a granite base with two rows of small square loopholes, a thin band of Tuscan Frieze run together onto the walls of a massive corner tower, equal in height. The rounded corners of the tower are flanked by widening pilasters.

== Gallery ==
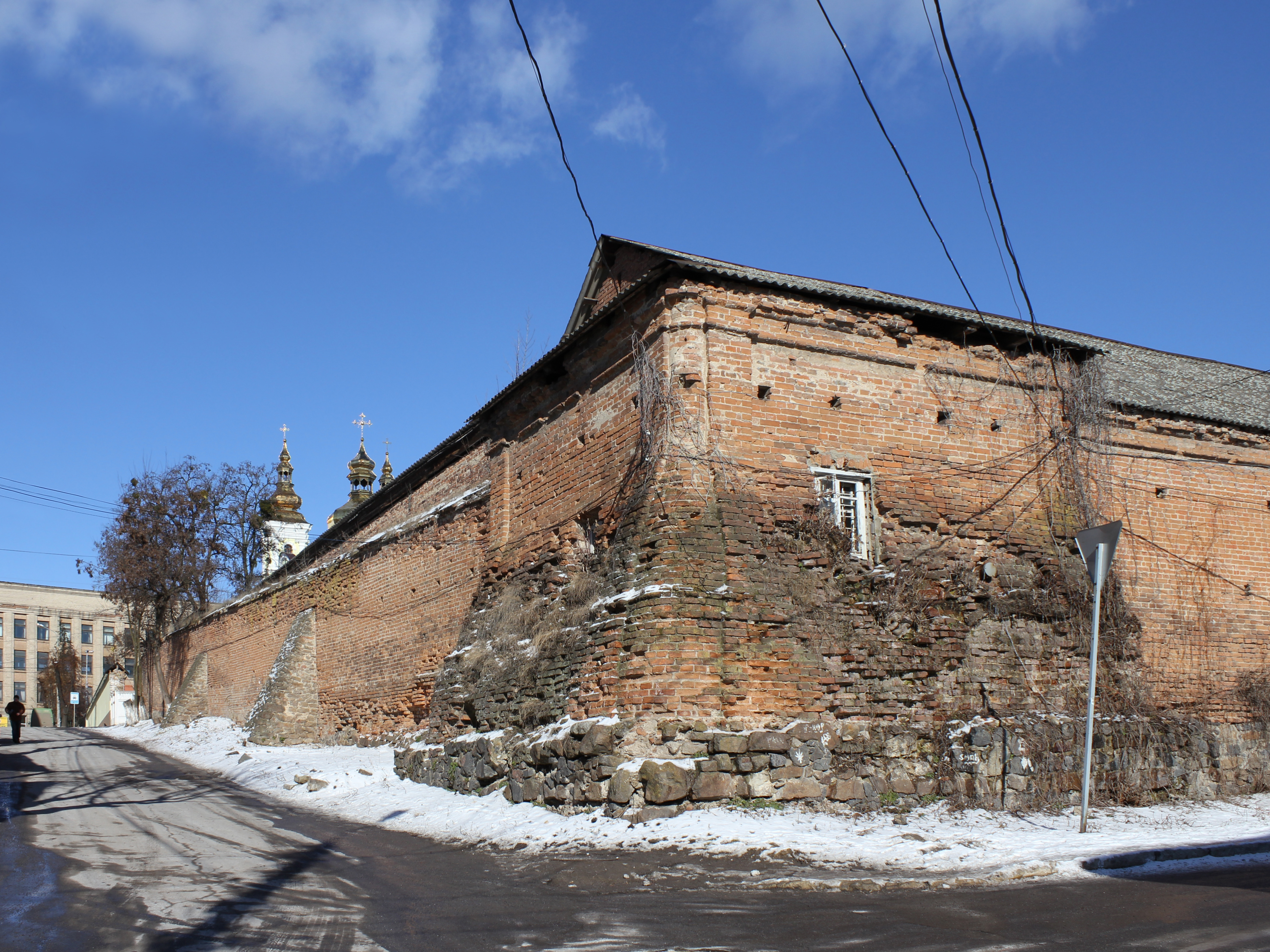
Extant walls and tower.

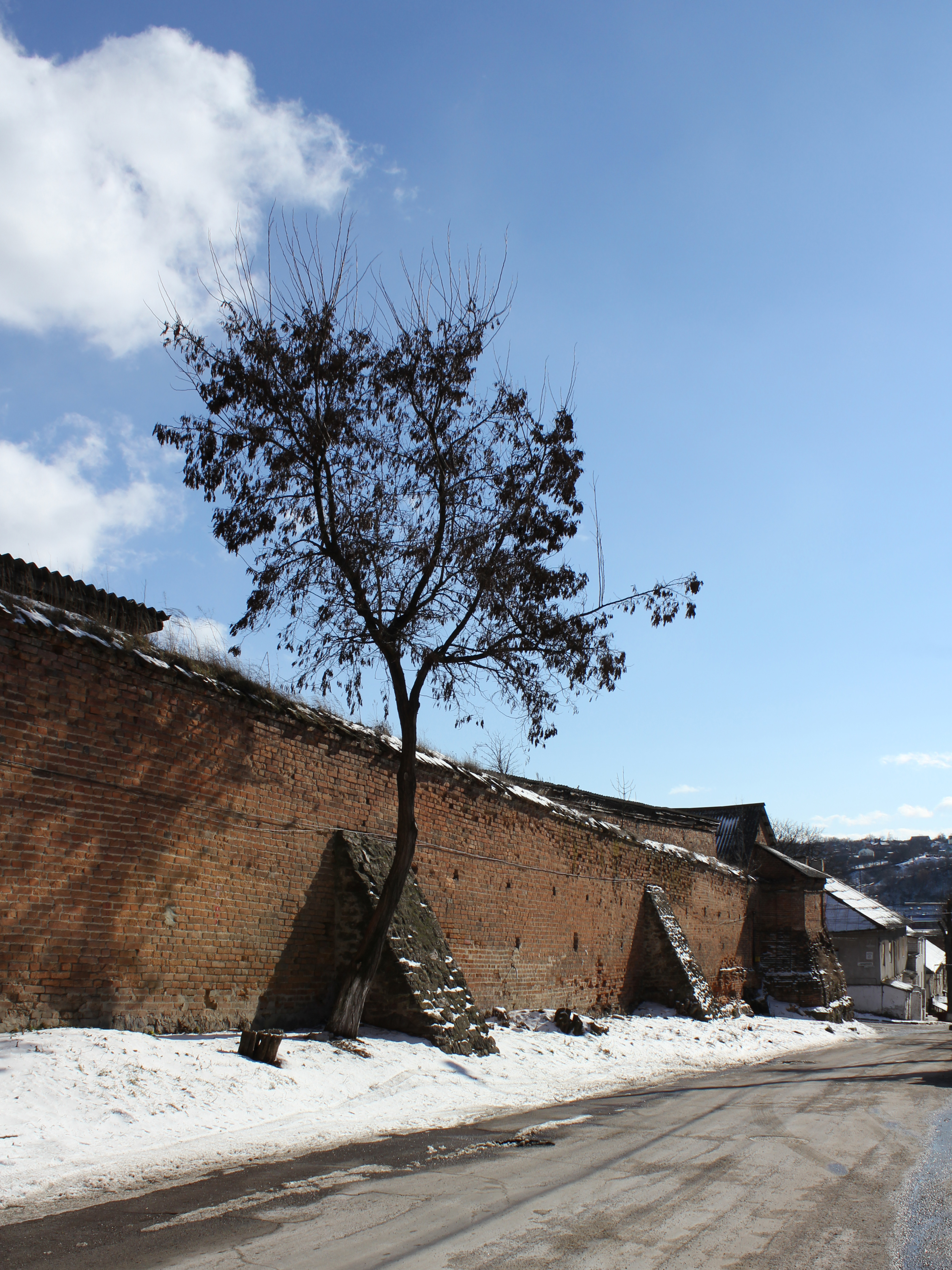
Extant walls.

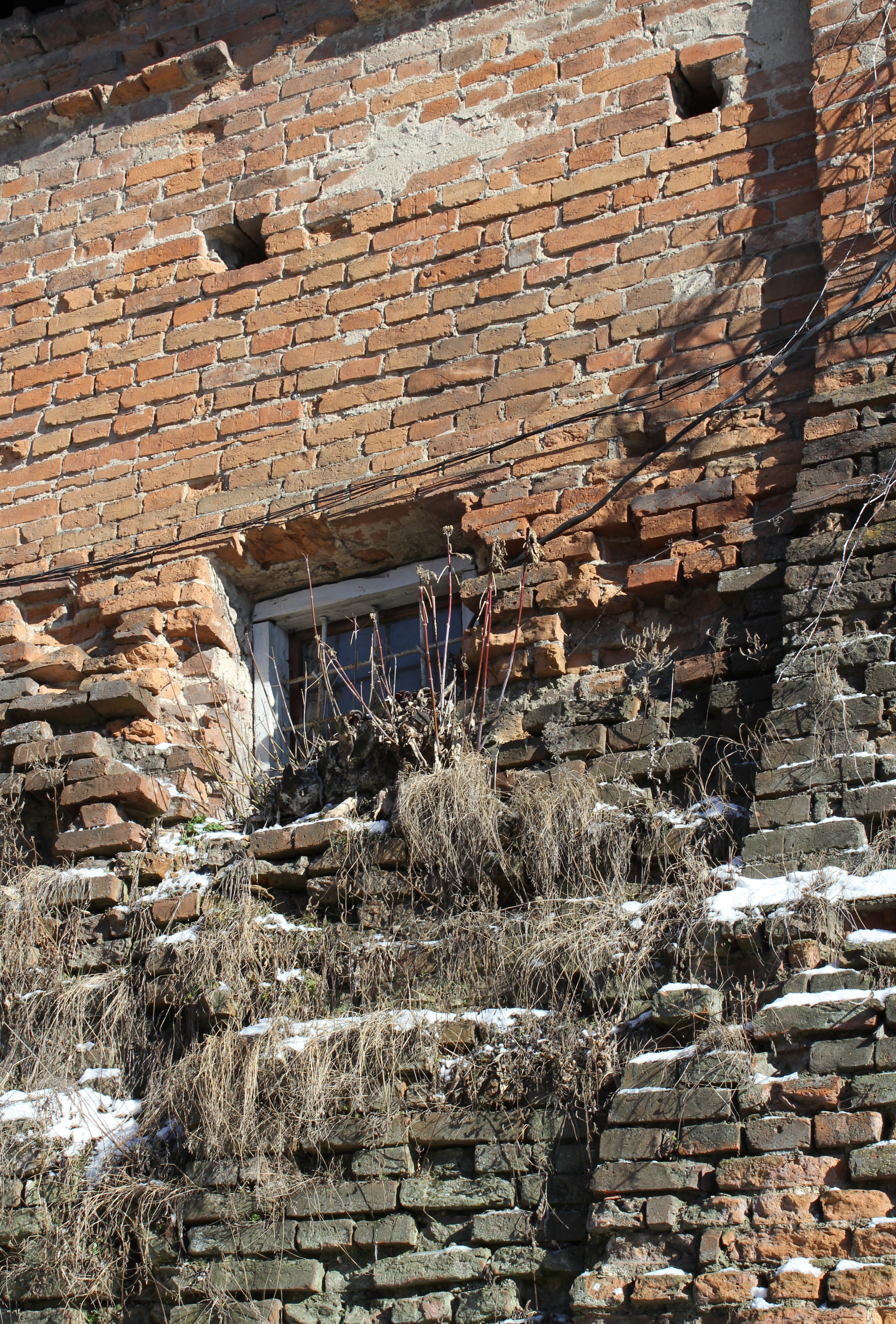
West window of the corner tower.

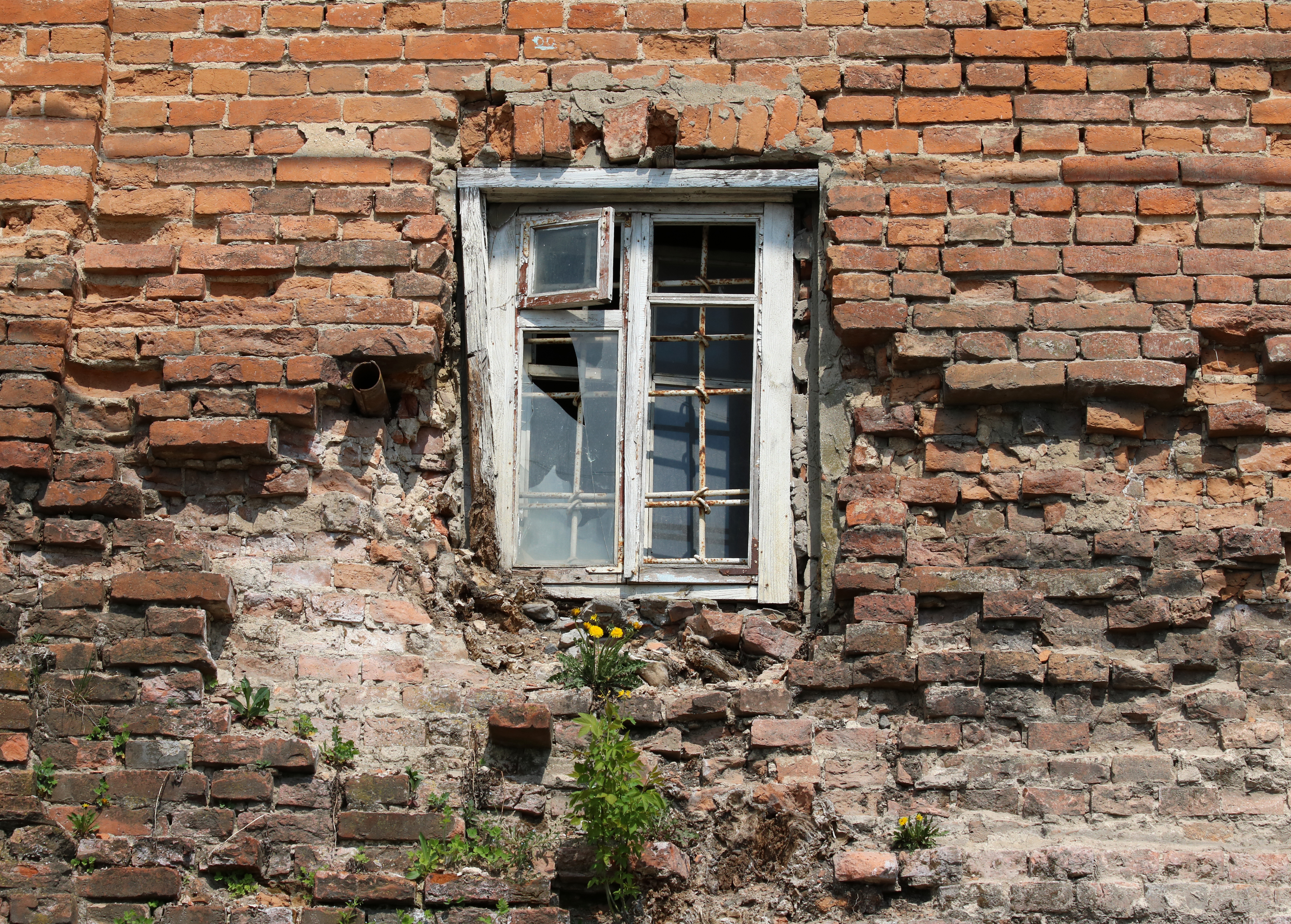
South window of the corner tower.
