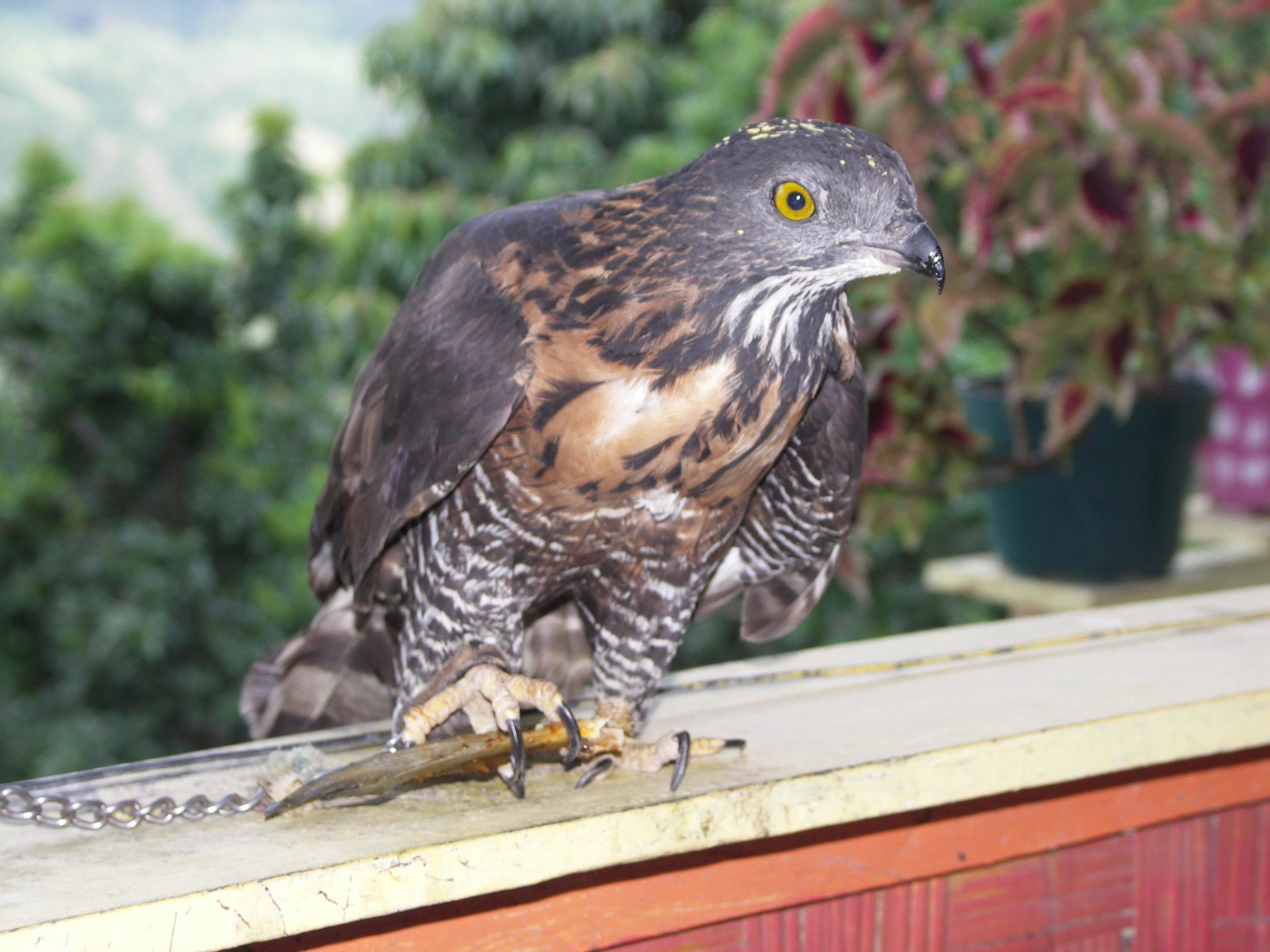

Conservation status
- Least Concern (IUCN 3.1)

Scientific classification
- Kingdom: Animalia
- Phylum: Chordata
- Class: Aves
- Order: Accipitriformes
- Family: Accipitridae
- Genus: Pernis
- Species: P. celebensis

Binomial name
- Pernis celebensis Wallace, 1868

= Barred honey buzzard =

Species of bird

The barred honey buzzard or Sulawesi honey buzzard (Pernis celebensis) is a species of bird of prey in the family Accipitridae. It is native to the Philippines and Sulawesi island of Indonesia. The bird inhabits forests from sea level to 1800 meters. It is 51–56 cm in length.
