= Vinnytsia Musuem of Local History =

1. REDIRECT Vinnytsia Museum of Local History
