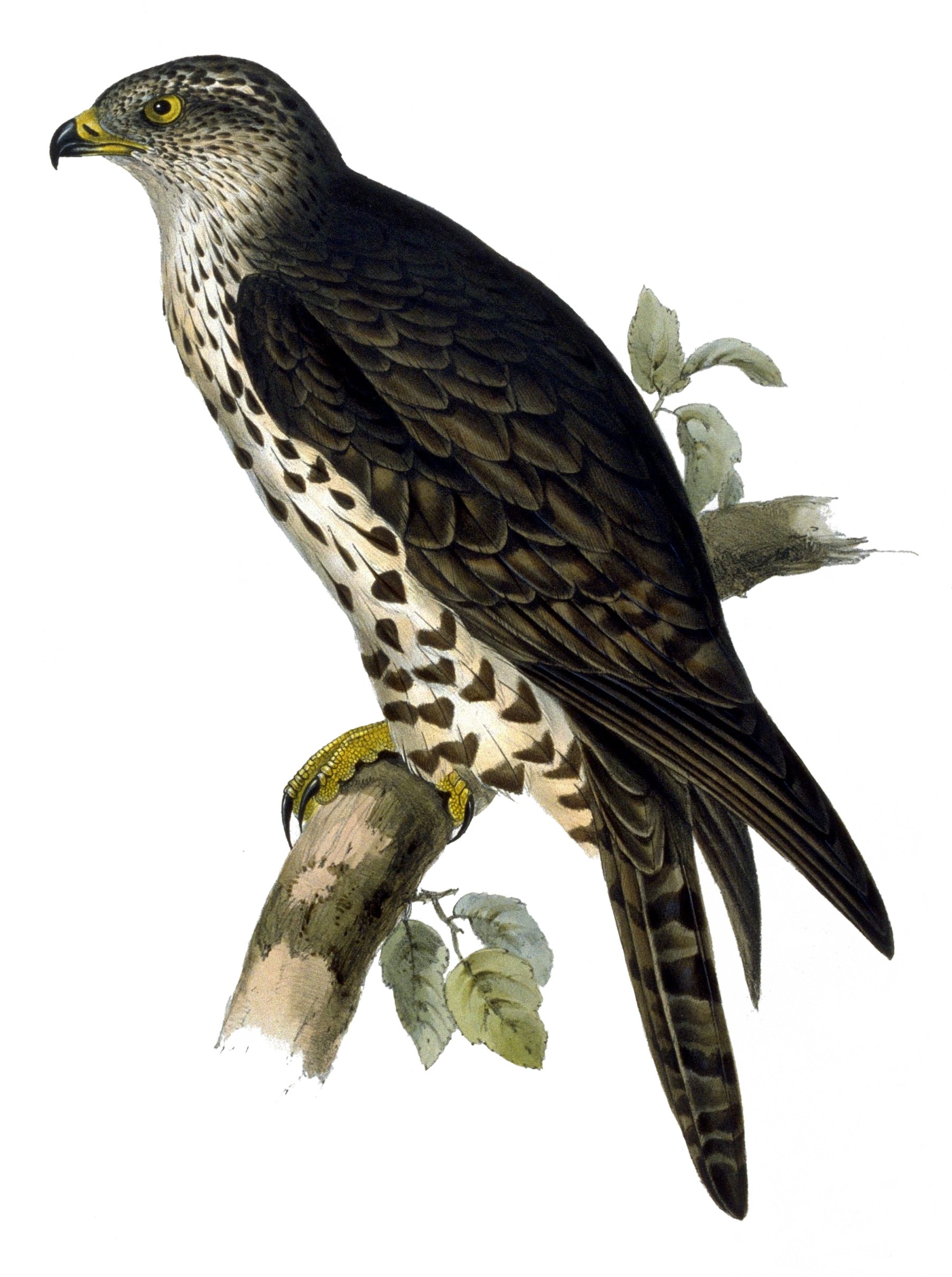
- European honey buzzard (Pernis apivorus)

Scientific classification
- Kingdom: Animalia
- Phylum: Chordata
- Class: Aves
- Order: Accipitriformes
- Family: Accipitridae
- Subfamily: Perninae
- Genus: Pernis; Cuvier, 1816

Type species
- Falco apivorus Linnaeus, 1758

Species
- P. apivorus P. ptilorhynchus P. celebensis P. steerei

= Pernis (bird) =

Genus of birds

Pernis is a genus of birds in the raptor subfamily Perninae. Its members are commonly known as honey buzzards. The genus name is derived from Ancient Greek pernes περνης, a term used by Aristotle for a bird of prey.

They breed in temperate and warmer climates of the Old World, and are specialist feeders on wasp and bee larvae. The two temperate species, the European and crested honey buzzards, are migratory.

They breed in woodland, and are often inconspicuous except when displaying.

The members of this genus have plumage which mimics that of juvenile common buzzards or of Nisaetus hawk-eagles. It has been suggested that the similarity has arisen as a partial protection against predation by larger raptors such as goshawks, which may be wary about attacking what appears to be a better-protected species with stronger bill and talons than the honey buzzards actually possess.

== Species ==
It consists of four medium-sized, broad-winged species.

Genus Pernis – Cuvier, 1816 – four species
Common name	Scientific name and subspecies	Range	Size and ecology	IUCN status and estimated population
European honey buzzard or Eurasian honey buzzard	Pernis apivorus (Linnaeus, 1758)	migratory: breeding Europe and western Asia, wintering Africa	Size: Habitat: Diet:	LC
Crested honey buzzard, eastern or oriental honey-buzzard	Pernis ptilorhynchus (Temminck, 1821) Six subspecies: P. p. orientalis – migratory: northern Asia in summer, India to Indonesia and Philippines in winter; P. p. ruficollis – India to Indo-China; P. p. torquatus – Indo-Malaya, Sumatra, Borneo; P. p. ptilorhynchus – Java; P. p. palawanensis – Palawan; P. p. philippensis – Philippines	Southeast Asia	Size: Habitat: Diet:	LC
Barred honey buzzard	Pernis celebensis Wallace, 1868	Sulawesi.	Size: Habitat: Diet:	LC
Philippine honey buzzard	Pernis steerei WL Sclater, 1919 Two subspecies: P. s. winkleri – Luzon island (in The Philippines); P. s. steerei – southern Philippines	Philippines.	Size: Habitat: Diet:	LC

Comparing sequences from a short subsection of the mitochondrial cytb gene, Gamulf and Haring found five clades: apivorus, steerei–winkleri, celebensis, philippensis–orientalis–ruficollis, and torquatus–ptilorhynchus–palawanensis. They proposed splitting the steerei–winkleri group from P. celebensis into a new species Pernis steerei, but felt that splitting Pernis ptilorhynchus would be "premature" given the lack of morphological differences.

Despite the name "crested honey buzzard", the subspecies P. p. orientalis, P. p. philippensis, and P. p. palawanensis all lack crests.
