= Vinnytsia Art Musuem =

Art museum in Ukraine

Vinnytsia Regional Art Museum
- Established: February 10, 1987
- Location: Soborna Street, 21, Vinnytsia, Ukraine
- Type: Art museum
- Founder: Illia Bezbakh
- Director: Mykhailo Kremeniuk
- Website: www.artmuz.org.ua

Vinnytsia Regional Art Museum is a regional art museum in the city of Vinnytsia in Ukraine. The museum is located in the architectural complex of the Vinnytsia Walls.

== History ==
Vinnytsia Regional Art Museum was established on October 2, 1987. The first director was Illia Bezbakh who held this position until 2017. The following Director was Ruslan Mykhailovych Palamarovsky until September 2025. Since then The director has been Mykhailo Kremeniuk.

By order of the Ministry of Culture of the Ukrainian SSR on January 27, 1988, about 4,000 items were moved here from the Vinnytsia Regional Museum of Local Lore.

Currently, the museum contains more than 15,000 items, mainly of fine and decorative arts, along with archival materials, personal belongings of artists and a library collection.

The origins of the art museum was the collection of the Podilsky Regional Museum of Art, Industry and Science, which was founded in 1918 and opened to the public in 1919 as a historical and domestic musuem. On May 5, 1919, an exhibition of private collections opened, which was called the People's Museum. Its collection was based on the museum collections of the Vinnytsia County Zemstvo, the Podilsky Society of Agriculture and Agricultural Industry, private collections of members of the Podilsky Society for the Protection of Historical Monuments.

In 1920, the collection of the museum included art from the Nemyriv Palace in Nemyriv.

The director of the art museum from 1921 to 1923 was the artist Stepan Slobodianiuk-Podolian, who gave his collection of coins, books and paintings.
