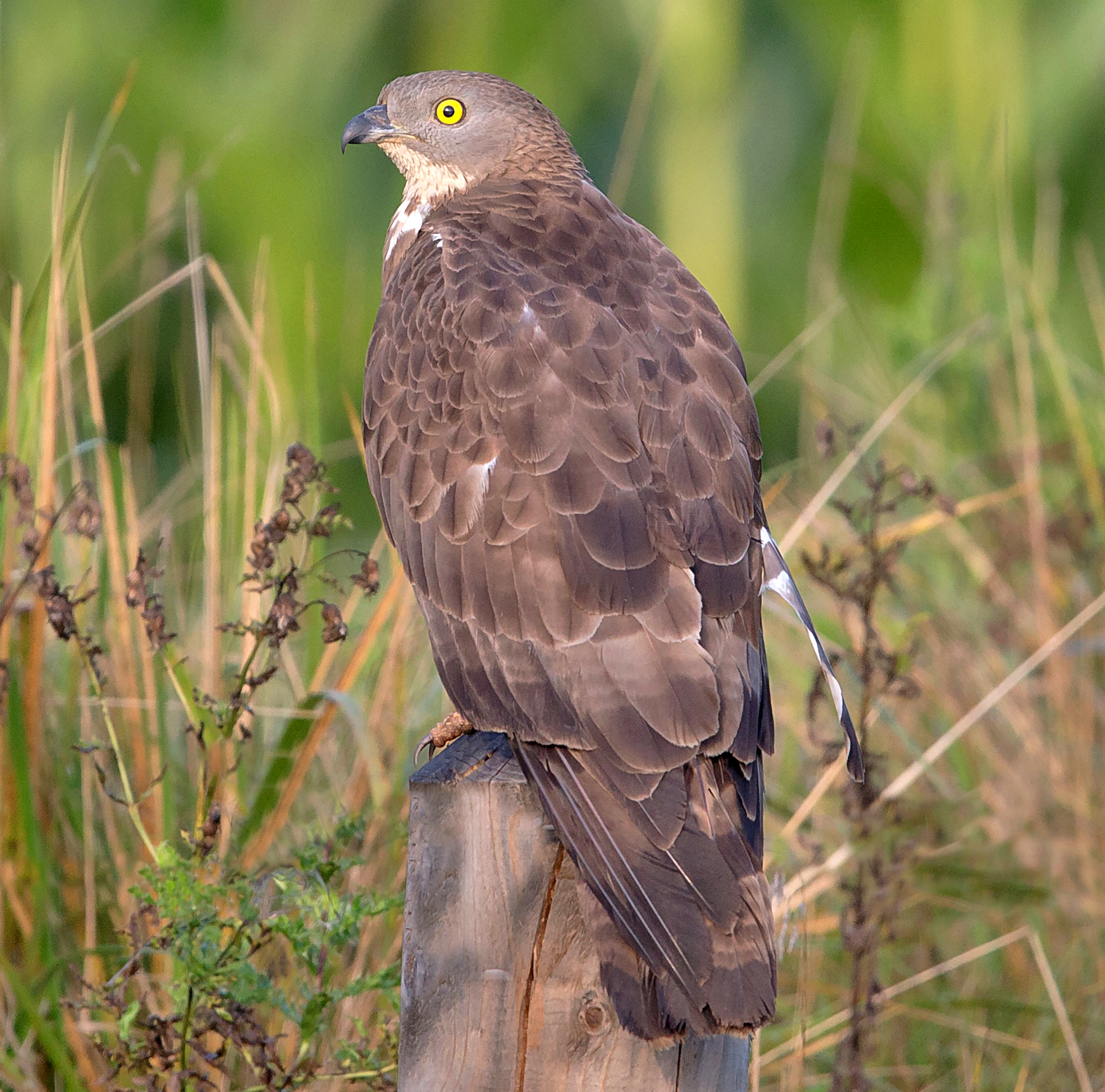
- Adult male in Germany

Conservation status
- Least Concern (IUCN 3.1)

Scientific classification
- Kingdom: Animalia
- Phylum: Chordata
- Class: Aves
- Order: Accipitriformes
- Family: Accipitridae
- Genus: Pernis
- Species: P. apivorus

Binomial name
- Pernis apivorus (Linnaeus, 1758)
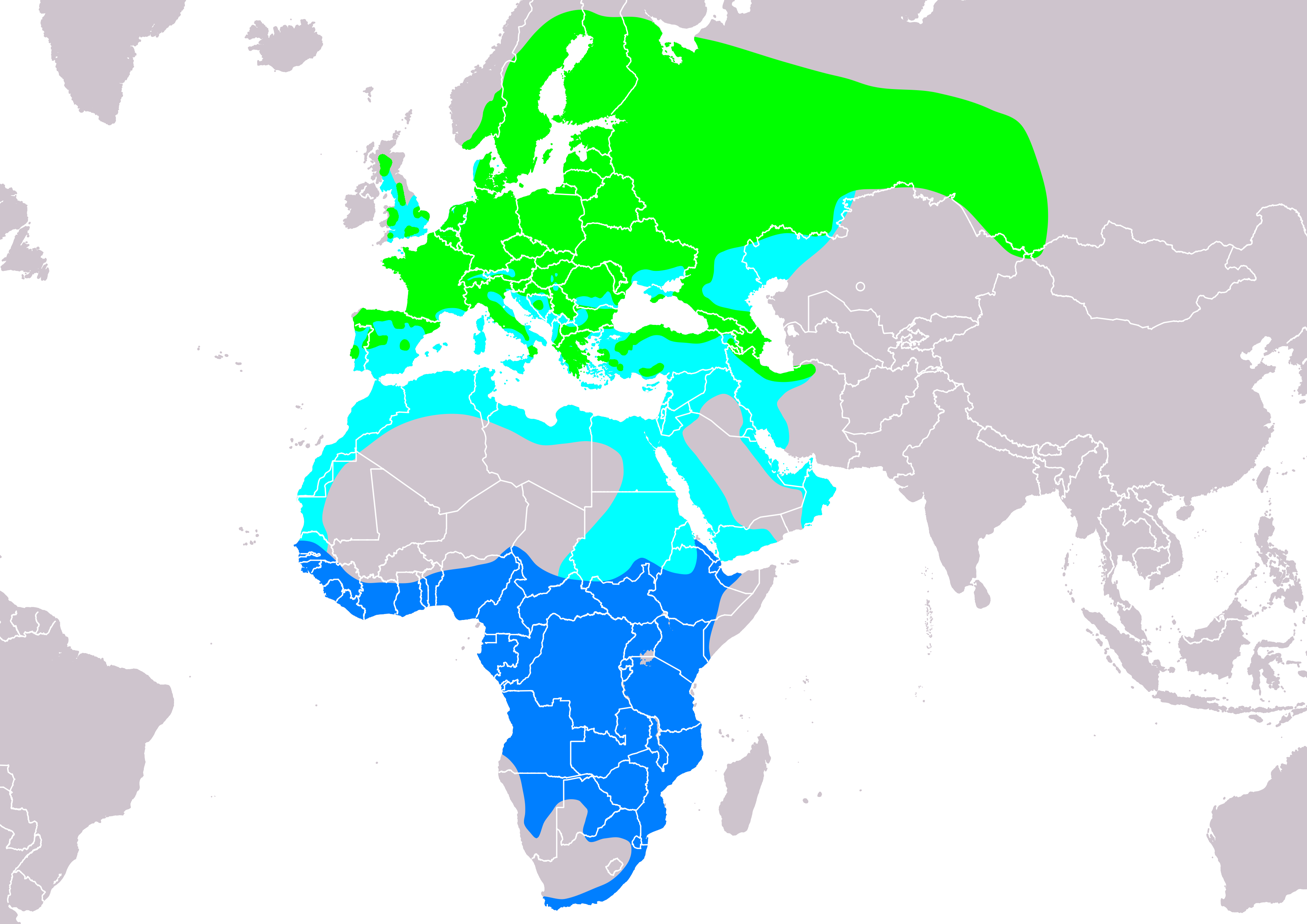
- Range of P. apivorus Breeding Non-breeding Passage

Synonyms
- Falco apivorus Linnaeus, 1758

= European honey buzzard =

Species of bird

The European honey buzzard (Pernis apivorus) is an insectivorous bird of prey in the family Accipitridae breeding in Europe and western Asia, and wintering in Africa.

== Taxonomy ==
The European honey buzzard was formally described in 1758 by Carl Linnaeus in the 10th edition of Systema Naturae. He placed it with the falcons and eagles in the genus Falco and coined the binomial name Falco apivorus. Linnaeus cited earlier works including the 1678 description by the English naturalist Francis Willughby and the 1713 description by John Ray.

The European honey buzzard is one of four species now placed in the genus Pernis that was described by Georges Cuvier in 1816. It is a monotypic species, with no subspecies being recognised. The genus is more closely related to kites in the genera Leptodon and Chondrohierax, than to the true buzzards in Buteo.

== Etymology ==
The binomen is derived from Ancient Greek pernes πέρνης, a term used by Aristotle for a bird of prey, and Latin apivorus "bee-eating", from apis, "bee" and -vorus, "-eating".

In the 19th century, it was also sometimes known as the 'pern' or 'common pern', from the scientific name.

== Description ==
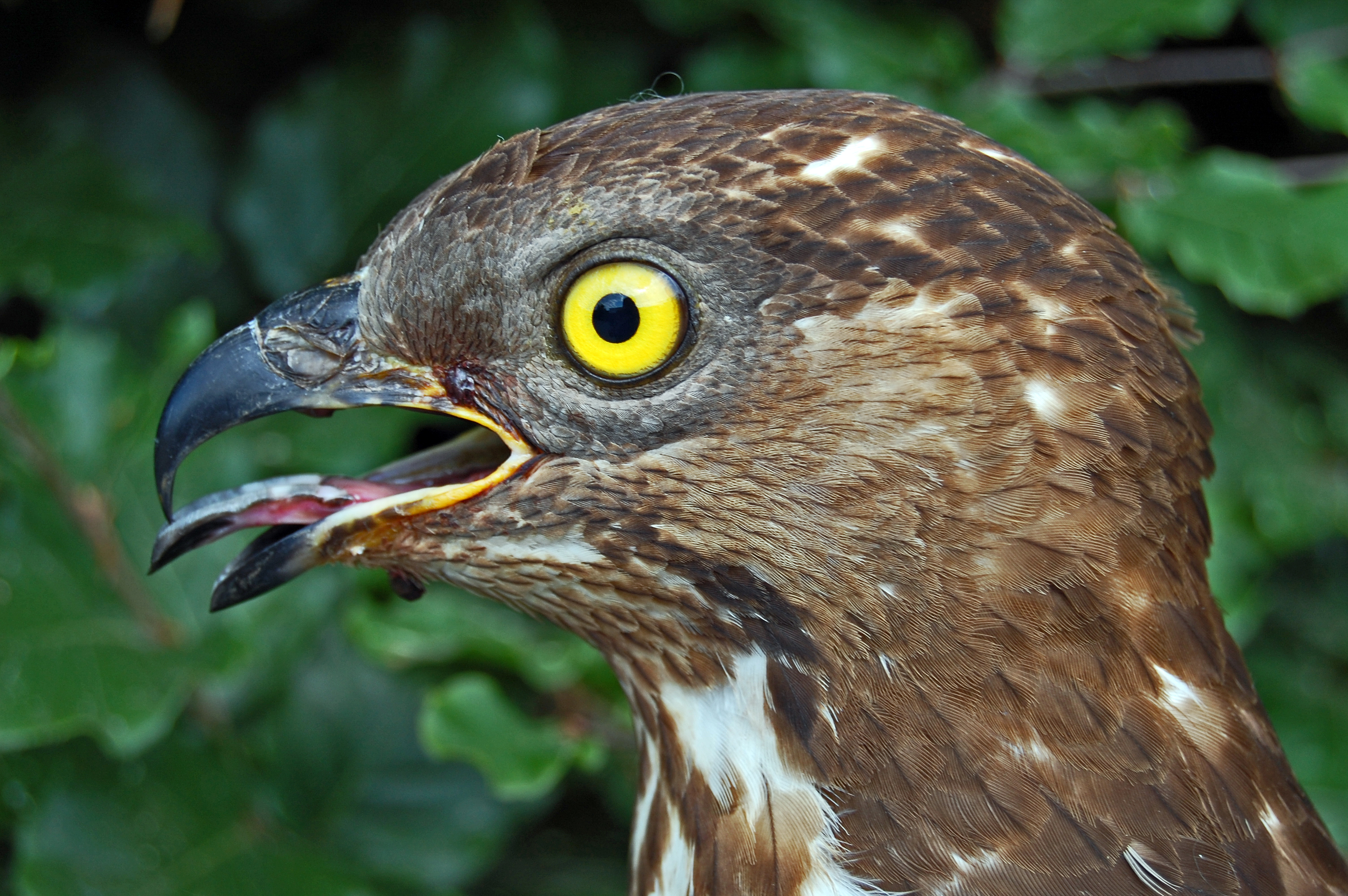
Scale-like feathers around the eyes and forehead provide armour against the stings of its prey species.

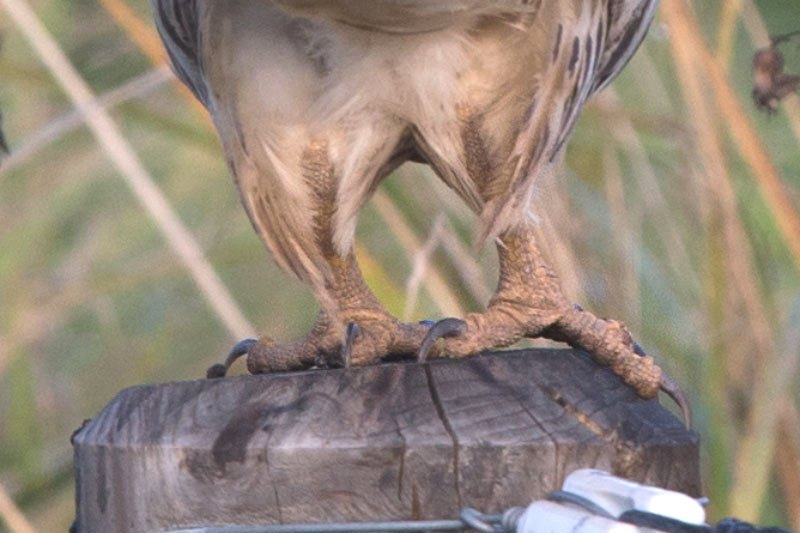
The relatively straight claws facilitate digging and walking.

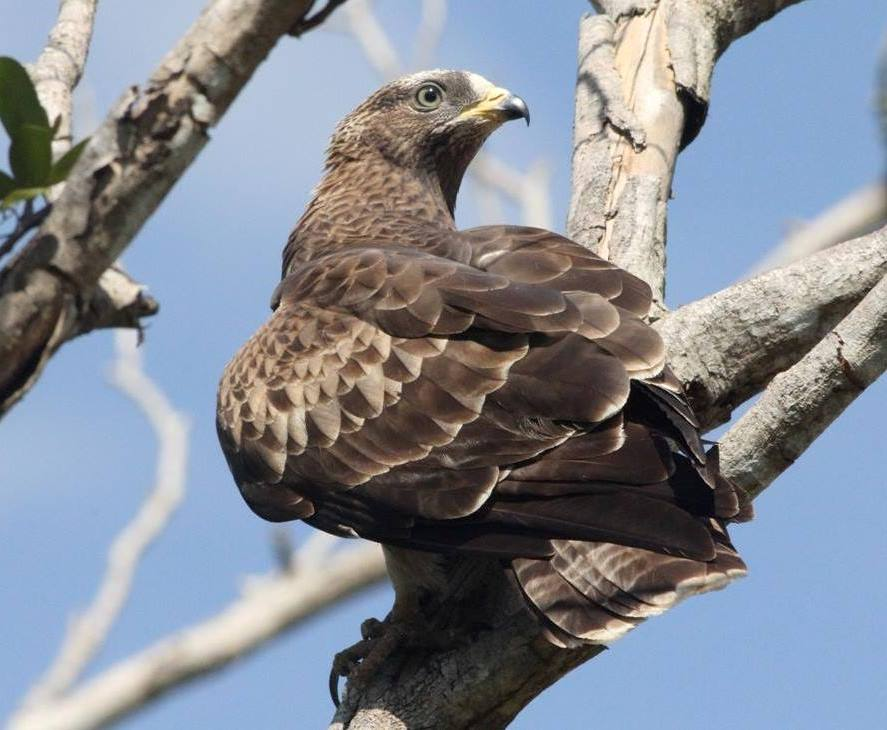
Immature birds have a dull iris and yellow cere.

The European honey buzzard is 52–60 cm (20–24 in) long, longer and longer winged, with a 130–150 cm (51–59 in) wingspan, when compared to the common buzzard (Buteo buteo), but at 440–1050 g, not as heavy-bodied as that is. It appears long-necked with a small head, and soars on flat wings. It has a longer tail, which has fewer bars than the Buteo buzzards, usually with two narrow dark bars and a broad dark subterminal bar. The sexes can be distinguished on plumage, which is unusual for a large bird of prey; the male has a blue-grey head, while the female's head is brown. The female is slightly larger and darker than the male.

The soaring jizz is quite diagnostic; the wings are held straight with the wing tips horizontal or sometimes slightly pointed down. The head protrudes forwards with a slight kink downwards and sometimes a very angular chest can be seen, similar to a sparrowhawk, although this may not be diagnostic. The angular chest is most pronounced when seen in direct flight with tail narrowed. The call is a clear peee-lu.

== Distribution and habitat ==
The European honey buzzard has a vast range estimated at 18,200,000 km^{2} (7,000,000 sq mi) including most of Europe, sub-Saharan Africa to western Russia, southwestern Siberia, and Kazakhstan. It is a summer migrant to most of the western Palearctic, absent only from the north and northwest fringes of the region. The eastern area boundary is not yet known exactly, it is thought to be in the Tomsk – Novosibirsk – Barnaul area. It is seen in a wide range of habitats, but generally prefers woodland, including plantations of exotic trees.

=== Movements ===
Being a long-distance migrant, the honey buzzard relies on magnetic orientation to find its way south, as well as (for adult birds) a visual memory of recognisable geographical features such as mountain ranges and rivers, along the way. It avoids large expanses of water over which it cannot soar. Accordingly, great numbers of honey buzzards can be seen crossing the Mediterranean Sea over its narrowest stretches, such as the Gibraltar Strait, the Messina Strait, the Bosphorus, Lebanon, or in Israel.

=== Status in Britain ===
The bird is scarce in the United Kingdom, though its population is increasing. Due to its secretive behaviour while breeding, its numbers are hard to determine; a dedicated survey in 2020-2021 found 109 breeding pairs, with the expected total being thought to be in the region of 130–150 pairs. The bulk of these are in southeastern England, but some breed as far west as mid Wales, and north to central Scotland. It is protected as a Schedule 1 species under the Wildlife and Countryside Act 1981, with the nests generally being kept secret by authorities to avoid disturbance and egg theft. The species's growing presence in the UK might be the result of maturing upland conifer forests.

== Behaviour and ecology ==
=== Mimicry ===
The similarity in plumage between juvenile European honey buzzard and common buzzard may have arisen as a partial protection against predation by Eurasian goshawks. Although that formidable predator is capable of killing both species, it is likely to be more cautious about attacking the better protected Buteo species, with its stronger bill and talons. Similar Batesian mimicry is shown by the Asian Pernis species, which resemble the Spizaetus hawk-eagles.

=== Breeding ===
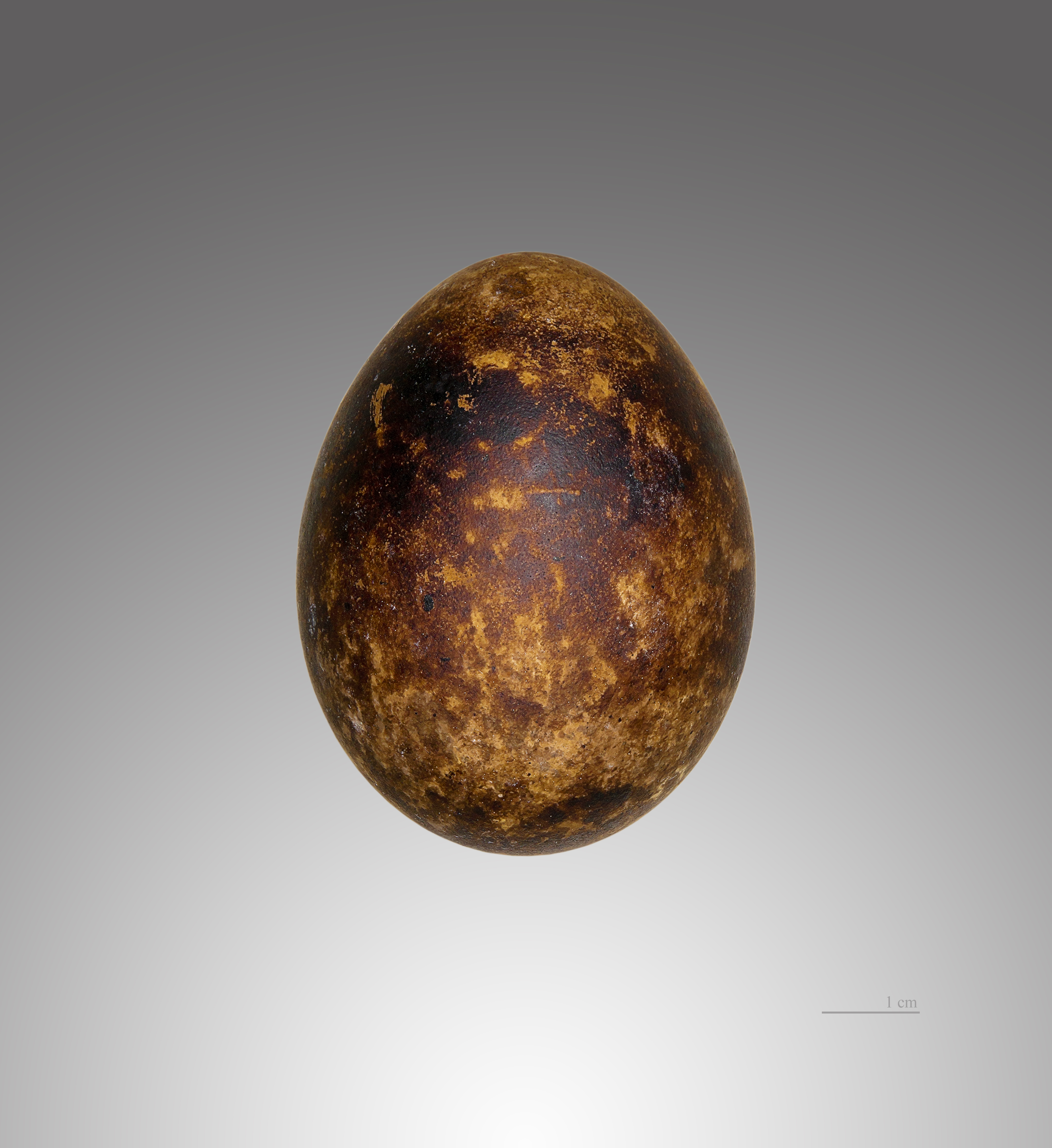
Eggs are heavily marked with brown on a white or pale buff background, and measure 5.1 x 4.1 cm.

The European honey buzzard breeds in woodland, and is inconspicuous except in the spring, when the mating display includes wing-clapping. Breeding males are fiercely territorial. The clutch typically consists of two eggs, less often one or three. Siblicide is rarely observed.

=== Feeding ===
An immature bird raiding a wasp nest

The European honey buzzard is a specialist feeder, living mainly on the larvae and nests of wasps and hornets, although it takes small mammals, reptiles, and birds. It is the only known predator in Europe of the invasive Asian hornet. It spends large amounts of time on the forest floor excavating wasp nests. It is equipped with long toes and claws adapted to raking and digging, and scale-like feathering on its head, thought to be a defence against the stings of its prey. Honey buzzards are thought to have a chemical deterrent in their feathers that protects them from wasp attacks.
