= Kostino, Russia =

Kostino (Russian: Костино) is the name of several rural localities in Russia.

== Modern localities ==
=== Arkhangelsk Oblast ===
Two rural localities in Arkhangelsk Oblast bear this name:

- Kostino, Lensky District, Arkhangelsk Oblast, a village in Lensky Selsoviet of Lensky District
- Kostino, Plesetsky District, Arkhangelsk Oblast, a village in Krasnovsky Selsoviet of Plesetsky District

=== Republic of Bashkortostan ===
One rural locality in the Republic of Bashkortostan bears this name:

- Kostino, Republic of Bashkortostan, a village in Pervomaysky Selsoviet of Yanaulsky District

=== Irkutsk Oblast ===
One rural locality in Irkutsk Oblast bears this name:

- Kostino, Irkutsk Oblast, a settlement in Nizhneudinsky District

=== Kaliningrad Oblast ===
One rural locality in Kaliningrad Oblast bears this name:

- Kostino, Kaliningrad Oblast, a settlement in Mayakovsky Rural Okrug of Gusevsky District

=== Kaluga Oblast ===
Four rural localities in Kaluga Oblast bear this name:

- Kostino (rural locality), Dzerzhinsky District, Kaluga Oblast, a railway crossing loop in Dzerzhinsky District
- Kostino (rural locality), Dzerzhinsky District, Kaluga Oblast, a village in Dzerzhinsky District
- Kostino, Maloyaroslavetsky District, Kaluga Oblast, a village in Maloyaroslavetsky District
- Kostino, a village in Sukhinichsky District

=== Republic of Khakassia ===
One rural locality in the Republic of Khakassia bears this name:

- Kostino, Republic of Khakassia, a village in Ustinkinsky Selsoviet of Ordzhonikidzevsky District

=== Kirov Oblast ===
Two rural localities in Kirov Oblast bear this name:

- Kostino, Kirov, Kirov Oblast, a settlement under the administrative jurisdiction of Oktyabrsky City District of the City of Kirov
- Kostino, Afanasyevsky District, Kirov Oblast, a village in Ichetovkinsky Rural Okrug of Afanasyevsky District; 58°55′N 53°16′E

=== Kostroma Oblast ===
Five rural localities in Kostroma Oblast bear this name:

- Kostino, Pankratovskoye Settlement, Chukhlomsky District, Kostroma Oblast, a village in Pankratovskoye Settlement of Chukhlomsky District
- Kostino, Petrovskoye Settlement, Chukhlomsky District, Kostroma Oblast, a village in Petrovskoye Settlement of Chukhlomsky District
- Kostino, Galichsky District, Kostroma Oblast, a village in Orekhovskoye Settlement of Galichsky District; 58°32′N 42°2′E
- Kostino, Kadyysky District, Kostroma Oblast, a village in Zavrazhnoye Settlement of Kadyysky District; 57°23′N 43°3′E
- Kostino, Soligalichsky District, Kostroma Oblast, a village in Pervomayskoye Settlement of Soligalichsky District

=== Krasnoyarsk Krai ===
One rural locality in Krasnoyarsk Krai bears this name:

- Kostino, Krasnoyarsk Krai, a village in Turukhansky District

=== Leningrad Oblast ===
One rural locality in Leningrad Oblast bears this name:

- Kostino, Leningrad Oblast, a village in Pashskoye Settlement Municipal Formation of Volkhovsky District

=== Moscow Oblast ===
Eleven rural localities in Moscow Oblast bear this name:

- Kostino, Kostinskoye Rural Settlement, Dmitrovsky District, Moscow Oblast, a selo in Kostinskoye Rural Settlement of Dmitrovsky District
- Kostino, Sinkovskoye Rural Settlement, Dmitrovsky District, Moscow Oblast, a village in Sinkovskoye Rural Settlement of Dmitrovsky District
- Kostino, Yakhroma, Dmitrovsky District, Moscow Oblast, a village under the administrative jurisdiction of the Town of Yakhroma in Dmitrovsky District
- Kostino, Orekhovo-Zuyevsky District, Moscow Oblast, a village in Davydovskoye Rural Settlement of Orekhovo-Zuyevsky District
- Kostino, Pushkinsky District, Moscow Oblast, a village under the administrative jurisdiction of Pravdinsky Work Settlement in Pushkinsky District
- Kostino, Ramensky District, Moscow Oblast, a village in Ulyaninskoye Rural Settlement of Ramensky District
- Kostino, Ruzsky District, Moscow Oblast, a village in Staroruzskoye Rural Settlement of Ruzsky District
- Kostino, Serpukhovsky District, Moscow Oblast, a village in Dankovskoye Rural Settlement of Serpukhovsky District
- Kostino, Shakhovskoy District, Moscow Oblast, a village in Seredinskoye Rural Settlement of Shakhovskoy District
- Kostino, Taldomsky District, Moscow Oblast, a village under the administrative jurisdiction of the Town of Taldom in Taldomsky District
- Kostino, Yegoryevsky District, Moscow Oblast, a village in Savvinskoye Rural Settlement of Yegoryevsky District

=== Nizhny Novgorod Oblast ===
Three rural localities in Nizhny Novgorod Oblast bear this name:

- Kostino, Bor, Nizhny Novgorod Oblast, a village in Redkinsky Selsoviet under the administrative jurisdiction of the town of oblast significance of Bor
- Kostino, Sokolsky District, Nizhny Novgorod Oblast, a village in Mezhdurechensky Selsoviet of Sokolsky District
- Kostino, Vadsky District, Nizhny Novgorod Oblast, a village in Kruto-Maydansky Selsoviet of Vadsky District

=== Novgorod Oblast ===
One rural locality in Novgorod Oblast bears this name:

- Kostino, Novgorod Oblast, a village under the administrative jurisdiction of the settlement of Lyubytinskoye in Lyubytinsky District

=== Omsk Oblast ===
One rural locality in Omsk Oblast bears this name:

- Kostino, Omsk Oblast, a selo in Kostinsky Rural Okrug of Muromtsevsky District

=== Orenburg Oblast ===
One rural locality in Orenburg Oblast bears this name:

- Kostino, Orenburg Oblast, a selo in Kostinsky Selsoviet of Kurmanayevsky District

=== Oryol Oblast ===
One rural locality in Oryol Oblast bears this name:

- Kostino, Oryol Oblast, a village in Podgorodnensky Selsoviet of Maloarkhangelsky District

=== Pskov Oblast ===
Four rural localities in Pskov Oblast bear this name:

- Kostino, Palkinsky District, Pskov Oblast, a village in Palkinsky District
- Kostino, Pechorsky District, Pskov Oblast, a village in Pechorsky District
- Kostino, Pushkinogorsky District, Pskov Oblast, a village in Pushkinogorsky District
- Kostino, Sebezhsky District, Pskov Oblast, a village in Sebezhsky District

=== Ryazan Oblast ===
Three rural localities in Ryazan Oblast bear this name:

- Kostino, Mikhaylovsky District, Ryazan Oblast, a village in Shchegolevsky Rural Okrug of Mikhaylovsky District
- Kostino, Rybnovsky District, Ryazan Oblast, a selo in Poshchupovsky Rural Okrug of Rybnovsky District
- Kostino, Yermishinsky District, Ryazan Oblast, a village in Bolshelyakhovsky Rural Okrug of Yermishinsky District

=== Samara Oblast ===
One rural locality in Samara Oblast bears this name:

- Kostino, Samara Oblast, a settlement in Bolshechernigovsky District

=== Smolensk Oblast ===
Two rural localities in Smolensk Oblast bear this name:

- Kostino, Gagarinsky District, Smolensk Oblast, a village in Samuylovskoye Rural Settlement of Gagarinsky District
- Kostino, Kholm-Zhirkovsky District, Smolensk Oblast, a village in Nakhimovskoye Rural Settlement of Kholm-Zhirkovsky District

=== Sverdlovsk Oblast ===
One rural locality in Sverdlovsk Oblast bears this name:

- Kostino, Sverdlovsk Oblast, a selo in Alapayevsky District

=== Tula Oblast ===
Two rural localities in Tula Oblast bear this name:

- Kostino, Leninsky District, Tula Oblast, a village in Varfolomeyevsky Rural Okrug of Leninsky District
- Kostino, Zaoksky District, Tula Oblast, a village in Romanovsky Rural Okrug of Zaoksky District

=== Tver Oblast ===
Eight rural localities in Tver Oblast bear this name:

- Kostino, Kimrsky District, Tver Oblast, a village in Pechetovskoye Rural Settlement of Kimrsky District
- Kostino, Krasnokholmsky District, Tver Oblast, a village in Likhachevskoye Rural Settlement of Krasnokholmsky District
- Kostino, Nelidovsky District, Tver Oblast, a village in Zemtsovskoye Rural Settlement of Nelidovsky District
- Kostino, Toropetsky District, Tver Oblast, a village in Skvortsovskoye Rural Settlement of Toropetsky District
- Kostino, Torzhoksky District, Tver Oblast, a village in Pirogovskoye Rural Settlement of Torzhoksky District
- Kostino, Zharkovsky District, Tver Oblast, a village in Novoselkovskoye Rural Settlement of Zharkovsky District
- Kostino, Vazuzskoye Rural Settlement, Zubtsovsky District, Tver Oblast, a village in Vazuzskoye Rural Settlement of Zubtsovsky District
- Kostino, Zubtsovskoye Rural Settlement, Zubtsovsky District, Tver Oblast, a village in Zubtsovskoye Rural Settlement of Zubtsovsky District

=== Udmurt Republic ===
One rural locality in the Udmurt Republic bears this name:

- Kostino, Udmurt Republic, a village in Sigayevsky Selsoviet of Sarapulsky District

=== Vladimir Oblast ===
Three rural localities in Vladimir Oblast bear this name:

- Kostino, Petushinsky District, Vladimir Oblast, a village in Petushinsky District
- Kostino, Sobinsky District, Vladimir Oblast, a village in Sobinsky District
- Kostino, Sudogodsky District, Vladimir Oblast, a village in Sudogodsky District

=== Vologda Oblast ===
Ten rural localities in Vologda Oblast bear this name:

- Kostino, Novolukinsky Selsoviet, Babayevsky District, Vologda Oblast, a village in Novolukinsky Selsoviet of Babayevsky District
- Kostino, Novostarinsky Selsoviet, Babayevsky District, Vologda Oblast, a village in Novostarinsky Selsoviet of Babayevsky District
- Kostino, Gulinsky Selsoviet, Belozersky District, Vologda Oblast, a village in Gulinsky Selsoviet of Belozersky District
- Kostino, Paninsky Selsoviet, Belozersky District, Vologda Oblast, a village in Paninsky Selsoviet of Belozersky District
- Kostino, Cherepovetsky District, Vologda Oblast, a village in Myaksinsky Selsoviet of Cherepovetsky District
- Kostino, Gryazovetsky District, Vologda Oblast, a village in Pokrovsky Selsoviet of Gryazovetsky District
- Kostino, Kharovsky District, Vologda Oblast, a village in Razinsky Selsoviet of Kharovsky District
- Kostino, Vashkinsky District, Vologda Oblast, a village in Porechensky Selsoviet of Vashkinsky District
- Kostino, Podlesny Selsoviet, Vologodsky District, Vologda Oblast, a village in Podlesny Selsoviet of Vologodsky District
- Kostino, Spassky Selsoviet, Vologodsky District, Vologda Oblast, a village in Spassky Selsoviet of Vologodsky District

=== Yaroslavl Oblast ===
Five rural localities in Yaroslavl Oblast bear this name:

- Kostino, Burmakinsky Rural Okrug, Nekrasovsky District, Yaroslavl Oblast, a village in Burmakinsky Rural Okrug of Nekrasovsky District
- Kostino, Klimovsky Rural Okrug, Nekrasovsky District, Yaroslavl Oblast, a village in Klimovsky Rural Okrug of Nekrasovsky District
- Kostino, Ogarkovsky Rural Okrug, Rybinsky District, Yaroslavl Oblast, a village in Ogarkovsky Rural Okrug of Rybinsky District
- Kostino, Pokrovsky Rural Okrug, Rybinsky District, Yaroslavl Oblast, a settlement in Pokrovsky Rural Okrug of Rybinsky District
- Kostino, Yaroslavsky District, Yaroslavl Oblast, a village in Ivnyakovsky Rural Okrug of Yaroslavsky District

== Abolished localities ==
- Kostino, Sharya, Kostroma Oblast, a village under the administrative jurisdiction of the town of oblast significance of Sharya; abolished on October 6, 2004
