= Kipet =

Village in Kaluga Oblast, Russia

Kipet Кипеть
- Village
- Location within Kaluga Oblast Location within Russia
- Coordinates: 54°06′37″N 35°23′02″E
- Country: Russia
- Oblast: Kaluga Oblast
- Raion: Sukhinichsky District
- Rural Settlement: Glazkovo Rural Settlement

Area
  - Total: 0.21 km^{2} (0.081 sq mi)
- Elevation: 200 m (660 ft)

Population (2010)
  - Total: 22
  - Density: 100/km^{2} (270/sq mi)
- Postal code: 249268

Kipet (Russian: Кипеть) is a village in Sukhinichsky District, Kaluga Oblast, Russia. Administratively, it is part of Glazkovo Rural Settlement.

== Geography ==
Kipet is located 6.8 kilometres south of Glazkovo, 1.5 metres southeast of Belilovo, 2 kilometres east of Sukhinichi, and adjacent to Kostino.

The village is in the Moscow Time (UTC+3)

== History ==
The village is shown on the 1860 and 1872 Schubert Maps.

== Demographics ==
According to the 2002 Russian census, there were 37 residents - 92% were Russian.

According to the 2010 Russian census, there were 22 residents - 46% male and 55% female.
