= Kostino, Kaluga Oblast =

Village in Kaluga Oblast, Russia

Kostino Костино
- Village
- Location within Kaluga Oblast Location within Russia
- Coordinates: 54°06′37″N 35°23′37″E
- Country: Russia
- Oblast: Kaluga Oblast
- Raion: Sukhinichsky District
- Rural Settlement: Glazkovo Rural Settlement

Area
  - Total: 0.55 km^{2} (0.21 sq mi)
- Elevation: 202 m (663 ft)

Population (2010)
  - Total: 23
  - Density: 42/km^{2} (110/sq mi)
- Postal code: 249268

Kostino (Russian: Костино) is a village in Sukhinichsky District, Kaluga Oblast, Russia. Administratively, it is part of Glazkovo Rural Settlement.

== Geography ==
Kostino is located 7 kilometres south of Glazkovo, 2.6 metres southeast of Belilovo, 3 kilometres east of Sukhinichi, and adjacent to Kipet.

The village is in the Moscow Time (UTC+3)

== History ==
The village is shown on the 1860 and 1872 Schubert Maps.

== Demographics ==
According to the 2002 Russian census, there were 21 residents - 95% were Russian.

According to the 2010 Russian census, there were 23 residents - 44% male and 57% female.
