= Protasovo, Kaluga Oblast =

Abandoned village in Kaluga Oblast, Russia

Protasovo Протасово
- Abandoned Village
- Location within Kaluga Oblast Location within Russia
- Coordinates: 54°9′29.88″N 35°22′48.42″E
- Country: Russia
- Oblast: Kaluga Oblast
- Raion: Sukhinichsky District
- Rural Settlement: Glazkovo Rural Settlement

Area
  - Total: 0.07 km^{2} (0.027 sq mi)

Population (2026)
  - Total: 0
  - Density: 0.0/km^{2} (0.0/sq mi)
- Postal code: 249268

Protasovo (Russian: Протасово) is an abandoned village in Sukhinichsky District, Kaluga Oblast, Russia. Administratively, it is part of Glazkovo Rural Settlement.

== Geography ==
Protasovo is located 1 kilometre east of Kolskoye, 1.3 kilometres southwest of Glazkovo, and 5 kilometres northeast of Sukhinichi.

== History ==
The village is shown on the 1860 and 1872 Schubert Maps.

The village was abolished in 2001.

== Famous people ==
- Mykhailo Panin, artist
