= Kolskoye =

Village in Kaluga Oblast, Russia

Kolskoye Кольское
- Village
- Location within Kaluga Oblast Location within Russia
- Coordinates: 54°09′24″N 35°21′48″E
- Country: Russia
- Oblast: Kaluga Oblast
- Raion: Sukhinichsky District
- Rural Settlement: Glazkovo Rural Settlement

Area
  - Total: 0.15 km^{2} (0.058 sq mi)
- Elevation: 205 m (673 ft)

Population (2010)
  - Total: 2
  - Density: 13/km^{2} (35/sq mi)
- Postal code: 249268

Kolskoye (Russian: Кольское) is a depopulated village in Sukhinichsky District, Kaluga Oblast, Russia. Administratively, it is part of Glazkovo Rural Settlement.

== Geography ==
Kolskoye is located 1 kilometre west of Protasovo, 1.7 kilometres southwest of Glazkovo, 3 kilometres north of Belilovo, and 3 kilometres northeast of Sukhinichi.

The village is in the Moscow Time (UTC+3)

== History ==
The village is shown on the 1860 and 1872 Schubert Maps.

== Demographics ==
According to the 2002 Russian census, there were 7 residents - 71% were Russian, and 29% were Ukrainian.

According to the 2010 Russian census, there were 2 residents - one man and one woman.
