= Zherdevo, Kaluga Oblast =

Village in Kaluga Oblast, Russia

Zherdevo Жердево
- Village
- Location within Kaluga Oblast Location within Russia
- Coordinates: 54°11′11″N 35°24′13″E
- Country: Russia
- Oblast: Kaluga Oblast
- Raion: Sukhinichsky District
- Rural Settlement: Glazkovo Rural Settlement

Area
  - Total: 0.39 km^{2} (0.15 sq mi)
- Elevation: 189 m (620 ft)

Population (2010)
  - Total: 17
  - Density: 44/km^{2} (110/sq mi)
- Postal code: 249268

Zherdevo (Russian: Жердево) is a village in Sukhinichsky District, Kaluga Oblast, Russia. Administratively, it is part of Glazkovo Rural Settlement.

== Geography ==
Zherdevo is located 1 kilometre northeast of Glazkovo and 8 kilometres northeast of Sukhinichi.

The village is in the Moscow Time (UTC+3)

== History ==
The village is shown on the 1860 and 1872 Schubert Maps.

== Demographics ==
According to the 2002 Russian census, there were 130 residents - all were Russian.

According to the 2010 Russian census, there were 17 residents - 47% male and 53% female.
