= Batal Hajji Belkhoroev =

Ingush sheikh

Sheikh Ustaz Batal Hajji Belkhoroev Белхарой Батал-Хьажа
- Title: Sheikh, Hajji, Ustaz

Personal life
- Born: Batal; 1821 Somyokh/Surkhakhi, (Note: According to most sources, he was born in Surkhakhi. According to other sources, he was born in Somoykh, a place near modern day Nesterovskaya in Ingushetia.) Ingushetia
- Died: 1914 (aged 89–90) Kozelsk, Kaluga Governorate, Russian Empire
- Resting place: Ziyarat of Batal Hajji, Surkhakhi, Ingushetia
- Home town: Somyokh/Surkhakhi,
- Parents: Anarbek (father); Rayzet (Zabiya) (mother)
- Era: Modern
- Education: Unknown

Religious life
- Religion: Islam
- Denomination: Sunni
- Lineage: Belkharoi
- Tariqa: Qadiri

Muslim leader
- Teacher: Kunta-Haji
- Disciples: Batal Hajjis

Batal Hajji Belkhoroev (Note: Also spelled Batal-Hajji, Batal Hadji, Battal Hajji, Battal Haji Belkhoroyev. If following the full Eastern Slavic naming convention, then his name is Batal Hajji Anarbekovich Belkhoroev (Russian: Батал-Хаджи Анарбекович Белхароев).; nicknamed 'Bison of Surkhakhi' (Russian: Сурхохский зубр, romanized: Surkhokhskiy zubr) and 'the only Ingush Shaykh'.) (Ingush: Белхарой Батӏал-Хьажа, romanized: Belxaroj Bathal-X́aža; c. 1824–1914) (Note: According to most sources, approximately, he was born in 1824 and died in 1914. According to others, he was born in 1821. However, Julietta Meskhidze mentions that the fact Batal Hajji was given evidence of his date of birth is contradictory. There also exists different speculations about his date of work, some claiming he was the age of Kunta-Haji. In her earlier work, Meskhidze indicated the date of Batal Hajji's birth as mid of 19th century and the death date as 10–20s of the 20th century. Hajjimurad Belkharoev, the great-grandson of Batal Hajji, determined Batal Hajji's birth and death dates as follows: per Hijri calendar, he lived from 25 Dhu al-Qadah 1239 (on al-Arb'ia', Arabic: الأربعاء, i. e. Wednesday night up to Thursday) to 25 Dhu al-Qadah 1332 (also on 'al-Arb'ia'); per Gregorian calendar he lived from July 21–22, 1824 to October 14, 1914 (on Wednesday night up to Thursday, i. e. 'al-Arb'ia'). His burial date is determined by Hajjimurad Belkharoev, as per Georgian calendar, as October 25, 1914 (on Sunday).) was an Ingush sheikh of the Qadiri Sufi order (tariqa) who founded his own independent Sufi suborder (wird). (Note: The wirds are also referred as 'brotherhoods' (Russian: pl. браства, sg. браство, romanized: bratsva, bratsvo; Ingush: pl. вошалаш sg. вошал, romanized: voshalash, voshal).)

At early age both of his parents died, after which, he moved to Chechnya. There Batal Hajji met Kunta-Haji, a Chechen Sufi sheikh who became his mentor. He was an outlaw (abrek) and supporter of Imam Shamil during the Caucasian War. Batal Hajji founded his own independent wird upon the arrest and exile of Kunta-Haji in 1864 or upon Kunta-Haji's death in 1867. Today it continues to exists amongst Ingush, and partly, amongst the Chechens and Kumyks. In 1911, after being accused of harbouring the Chechen outlaw Zelimkhan he was exiled to Kozelsk, later dying there in 1914.

== Background ==
Batal Hajji was born in 1824 in Ingushetia, either in Surkhakhi or in Somyokh. He was an ethnic Ingush of the Belkharoi clan (teip). The Belkharoi, according to a legend, trace their lineage to a legendary figure called Borga. (Note: The legend was recorded in 1975 by Akhmed Malsagov from the words of a resident of the village of Alkhasty, Lors Fargiev (born in 1877).) Batal Hajji's father was Anarbek, while his mother was named Rayzet (Zabiya).

At the age of seven, Batal's mother died and soon his father died as well. He was taken under the care of his mother's relatives, who at that time lived in Chechnya. During his 10 years of living there, he met Kunta-Haji, a Chechen Sufi sheikh, with whom he discussed matters of spirituality that sparked his interest. It is unknown if he received any religious education during his lifetime. During the Caucasian War, he was a supporter of Imam Shamil and led units of outlaws (abreks). He himself was an outlaw.

== Return to Ingushetia and Hajj ==
At the time of Batal Hajji's return to Ingushetia, there was a process of Islamisation and Christianization of the Ingush people. The Ingush had to go lengths to visit Chechnya to meet there Kunta-Haji as they didn't have their own spiritual mentor. Accordingly, one time Ingush again went on to meet Kunta-Haji to consult with him. He said to them that Batal Hajji is their new mentor who they should now approach instead of him: "Truly this is a ustaz, a sheikh from Surkhakhi Batal, from now on you can turn to him for advice and take toba."

In 1859, Batal Hajj completed a three-year Islamic pilgrimage (Hajj) to Mecca as well as a pilgrimage to Medina, as indicated by the title 'Hajji' in his name. According to tradition, Batal Hajji had a vision from Muhammad while he was in Mecca, who offered him a choice between this life and the afterlife. Batal Hajji chose this life expecting he could gain a place in the afterlife with his good works.

== The wird ==
=== Foundation ===
Batal Hajji founded the wird, either, after the arrest and exile of Kunta-Haji in 1864, or after his death in 1867. The first followers of the wird were the inhabitants of Surkhakhi, Nazran, Nasyr-Kort, Plievo and Upper-Achaluki, but later followers came from other places. The size of the wird was estimated by John F. Baddeley, a British traveler known for his works on the Caucasus region, to be 100 families in 1901.

=== Characteristics ===
The distinct features of the members of the wird of Batal Hajji were the cut beard and usage of long daggers (kinjals), berdan rifles and pistols, spiritual power and mutual assistance as well as helping each other in difficult situations. The Soviets accused the Batal Hajjis of being connected to "(...) grave crimes against social order and Soviet law", and that the leadership of the wird "(...) used religion for its own selfish aims and personal profit."

The wird of Batal Hajji has some differences in Islamic practices that can be compared with the wirds of Kunta-Haji and Denni-Arsanov. For example, during the burial, the underside in the grave is done on the left side, as Muhammad was buried, while the Kunta-Haji wird does the underside in the grave on the right side as they see that as a way to pay respect to Muhammad. Unlike the wird of Kunta-Haji, loud dhikr is carried out in the wird of Batal-Haji, while standing in a circle and rhythmically whirling in place to place, clapping their hands and repeating with "la ilaha illa-l-lahi" ("There is no God but Allah") or other religious hymns (nazms). Unlike the wird of Chimmirza, women don't participate in the whirling in the wird of Batal Hajji. While in the wird of Batal Hajji and Kunta Hajji The sacrificial animal is slaughtered, in the wird of Bamat-Girey-Hajji it is not.

Intermarriages within the wird are encouraged. Although women are forbidden to marry men of other wirds, men are allowed to marry women of other wirds. At the same time, the couples are warned that on the Day of Judgment, they will be close only to their personal sheikh, so the mixed couples will disperse. Weddings are not accompanied by music and dancing and being merry during the wedding are not acceptable. Members of the wird are forbidden to share their meal with someone who is not part of the wird.

=== Batal Hajji's Teachings ===
Batal Hajji loved Quran and he taught people to read it. He also noted that "faith makes people right and pure in earthly and future life, and knowledge elevates a person". Batal Hajji actively fought Ingush paganism which had remained alive in some traditions.

== Later years ==
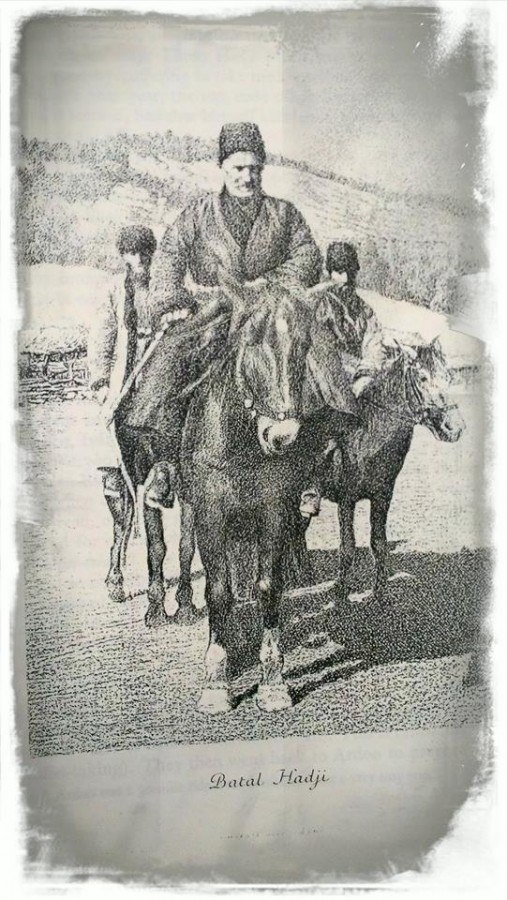
Photograph taken by John F. Baddeley on October 8, 1901, during his travel in Ingushetia.

In 1892, Batal Hajji was arrested "for harmful religious propaganda" and sent to exile in Kozelsk, but by the amnesty in honor of the coronation of Emperor Nicholas II, he was allowed to return to Ingushetia in 1896. John F. Baddeley met with Batal Hajji on 8 October 1901. According to him, Batal was the successor of Kunta-Haji (Note: The fact that some sources indicate Batal Hajji as the successor of Kunta-Haji was noted by Julietta Meskhidze.) and he described him as follows: "He as was an old man, rather stout, with a good face and a very courteous manner."

=== Death ===
In 1911, Tsarist authorities of Russian Empire were fearing of an uprising under the influence of calls from clerics. Prominent religious figures, among which was Batal Hajji, were accused of harboring the Chechen outlaw Zelimkhan and exiled. The accused religious figures included the Chechen sheikhs (Bammat Girey Hajji, Suhayp Mulla, Dokku Sheikh, Mulla Mahoma, Kana Hajji, Chimmirza), as well as the future emir of North Caucasian Emirate, Avar Sheikh Uzun-Hajji. Batal Hajji was exiled to Kozelsk, Kaluga Governorate, where in 1914, he died.

Because of Pavel Gaidukov's request, permission was granted to transport Batal Hajji's body back to Ingushetia on a special wagon. He was buried on October 25, 1914, in Surkhakhi, where his Ziyarat is located today. The funeral was accompanied by a loud dhikr of the Kunta and Batal Hajjis for many hours. The funeral was attended by residents from all over the North Caucasus. After Batal Hajji's death, his eldest son Magomed succeeded him in becoming the head of the wird.

== Family ==
Batal Hajji had a wife, who according to John F. Baddeley, has been respected more than any other Ingush women. She had already died by the time Baddeley had met Batal Hajji in 1901. Batal Hajji had seven sons, most of whom were executed by the Soviets as they bitterly resisted the Bolsheviks. His son Muhammed, for example, was supporter of the anti-Soviet imam Najmuddin of Gotzo and was executed while trying to flee to Turkey in 1920 or 1921. His other son, Qureysh, led a guerilla movement in Chechen-Ingush ASSR and North-Ossetian ASSR, but was caught in 1947 and arrested. In 1957, he was released and returned to his homeland, leading the wird up to his death in 1964. Batal Hajji also had his only daughter, named Zaleikha. She was nicknamed 'hama hovsh yolu sag' (хьама ховш йолу саг, lit. 'person knowing something') and 'daqha danna sag' (дакъа данна саг, 'person who received a blessing') for her abilities to communicate with the jinns, her particular healing abilities, as well as for the amulets and talismans she created.

The grandsons of Batal Hajji were also kept under surveillance by the Soviet Regime, and some of them, like Jabra'il, Ahmet, Mustafa, Maksharip, Huseyn and Sultan, died in exchanges of gunfire between the Soviet police (militsia).

== Legacy ==
Today, Batal Hajji's wird is a large Sufi suborder, the most exclusive and cohesive in the Caucasus region out of all the other Sufi wirds, playing an important role in the socio-economic and political life of Ingushetia. Batal Hajji's wird continues to exist amongst Ingush, and partly amongst the Chechens and Kumyks. The percentage of the Batal Hajjis amongst the Ingush is estimated by the Muftiate of Ingushetia to be 4.5%. In 1968, the wird had 400 murids. In Batal Hajji's honor, a cemetery (ziyarat) and a mosque was built in the village of Surkhakhi.

== Sources ==
=== English sources ===
- Askerov, Ali (22 April 2015). Historical Dictionary of the Chechen Conflict. Lanham: Rowman & Littlefield. pp. 1–310. ISBN 9781442249257 – via Google Books.
- Baddeley, John F. (1940). The Rugged Flanks of Caucasus. Vol. 1. London: Oxford University Press, Humphrey Milford. pp. 1–318.
- Bennigsen, Alexandre; Wimbush, S. Enders (1985). Mystics and Commissars: Sufism in the Soviet Union. Berkeley: University of California Press. pp. 1–195. ISBN 9780520055766.
- Dettmering, Christian (10 January 2014). "No Love Affair: Ingush and Chechen Imperial Ethnographies". In Cvetkovski, Roland; Hofmeister, Alexis (eds.). An Empire of Others: Creating Ethnographic Knowledge in Imperial Russia and the USSR. Budapest: Central European University Press. pp. 341–368. ISBN 9789633862421.
- Gammer, Moshe (2006). Harris, J. (ed.). The Lone Wolf and the Bear: Three Centuries of Russian Defiance of Russian Rule. Pitt Series in Russian and East European Studies. Pittsburgh: University of Pittsburgh Press. pp. 1–252. ISBN 0-8229-5898-8.
- Meskhidze, Juliette (March–June 2006a). "Shaykh Batal Hajji from Surkhokhi: towards the history of Islam in Ingushetia" (PDF). Central Asian Survey. 25 (1–2). Routledge: 179–191. doi:10.1080/02634930600903262. eISSN 1465-3354. ISSN 0263-4937. OCLC 202671183. S2CID 143571210.
- Youngblood, D. J. (2003). "Battal Hajji Brotherhood". In Adams, B. F. (ed.). The Supplement to The Modern Encyclopedia of Russian, Soviet and Eurasian History. Vol. 4: Bashkir Autonomous Soviet Socialist Republic – Bugaev, Boris Nikolaevich. Columbia, Missouri: Academic International Press. pp. 45–46. ISBN 9780875691428. OCLC 33150272.
- Zelkina, Anna (2010-07-14). "Batal Hajji Belkhoroev". In Fleet, Kate; Krämer, Gudrun; Matringe, Denis; Nawas, John; Rowson, Everett (eds.). Encyclopaedia of Islam. Vol. 2010–1 (3rd ed.). Brill Online. ISBN 978-90-04-18390-2. ISSN 1873-9830.

=== Russian sources ===
- Albogachiev, R.-Kh. Sh.-Kh. (2010). Шейх Овлия Батал-хаджи Белхороев [Sheikh Ovliya Batal-haji Belkhoroev] (in Russian). Nalchik.
- Albogachieva, Makka (2012). "О некоторых особенностях братства Батал-Хаджи Белхороева" [On some features of the wird brotherhood established by Batal-Hajji Belkhoroev]. Pax Islamica (in Russian). 5 (1–2): 118–124. doi:10.24848/islmlg.05.1-2.13. ISSN 2541-884X.
- Albogachieva, Makka (2013). "Ислам" [Islam]. In Albogachieva, Makka; Martazanov, Arsamak; Solovyeva, Lyubov (eds.). Ингуши [The Ingush]. Narody I kultury (in Russian). Moscow: Nauka. pp. 319–332. ISBN 978-5-02-038042-4.
- Albogachieva, Makka (2015). "Влияние социально-философских идей Ханбалийского проповедника Абдула-Кадира аль-Джилани на Исламскую культуру народов Кавказа" [The influence of the socio-philosophical ideas of the Hanbali preacher Abdul-Qadir al-Jilani on the Islamic culture of the Caucasus people] (PDF). Страны и народы востока (in Russian) (36: Религии на Востоке). Moscow: Nauka–Vostochnaya Literatura: 160–189.
- Albogachieva, Makka (2017). Ислам в Ингушетии: этнография и историко-культурные аспекты [Islam in Ingushetia: ethnography and historical and cultural aspects] (in Russian). St. Petersburg: Kunstkamera. pp. 1–264. ISBN 978-5-88431-349-1.
- Albogachieva, Makka (2019). "Места паломничества в Ингушетии" [Pilgrimage Sites in Ingushetia] (PDF). Kunstkamera (in Russian). 4 (2): 228–241. doi:10.31250/2618-8619-2019-2(4)-230-241. eISSN 2712-8636. ISSN 2618-8619. S2CID 202186721.
- Akhmadov, Yavus; Khasmagomadov, Edilbek (2005). История Чечни в XIX—XX веках [History of Chechnya in the XIX-XX centuries] (in Russian). Moscow: Puls. pp. 1–995. ISBN 5-93486-046-1.
- Belkharoev, Hajjimurad (2022). "О личности и религиозной деятельности суфийского авлия (шейха) Валийюллаха Батал-Хаджи Белхароева: Комментарии к научным статьям Э. В. Казиева (размышления над источниками и историографией)" [On the personality and religious activities of the Sufi avliya (sheikh) Valiyullah Batal-Haji Belkharoev: Comments on scientific articles by E. V. Kaziev (reflections on sources and historiography)]. Gumanitarnye Issledovaniya. Istoriya I Fiologiya (in Russian) (8). Perm State Humanitarian Pedagogical University: 15–28. doi:10.24412/2713-0231-2022-8-15-28. eISSN 2713-0231.
- Borusevich, K. I. (1893). Yanchuk, Nikolai (ed.). "Сектанство среди ингушей" [Sectarianism among the Ingush]. Etnograficheskoe Obozrenie (in Russian). 18 (3). Moscow: Vysoch. utv. T-vo Skoron. A. A. Levenson: 139–144.
- Daudov, Abdulla; Meskhidze, Juliette (2009). Komissarova, I. P. (ed.). Национальная государственность горских народов Северного Кавказа (1917—1924) [National statehood of the mountain peoples of the North Caucasus (1917-1924)] (in Russian). St. Petersburg: St. Petersburg State University Press. pp. 1–223.
- Kaziev, Eduard (2018). "Шейх Батал-Хаджи Белхароев и его вирд в воспоминаниях английского путешественника и журналиста Д.Ф. Бэддли" [Sheikh Batal-Haji Belkharoev and his wird in the memoirs of the English traveler and journalist D.F. Baddley]. Etnograficheskoe Obozrenie (in Russian) (2). Moscow: Nauka: 89–99. doi:10.7868/S0869541518020070. ISSN 0869-5415.
- Malsagov, Akhmet; Dakhkilgov, Ibragim (1986). Сказки, сказания и предания чеченцев и ингушей [Fairy tales, legends and legends of Chechens and Ingush] (in Russian). Grozny: ChIKI. pp. 1–528.
- Meskhidze, Juliette (1998). "Чечено-Ингушетия" [Checheno-Ingushetia] (PDF). In Prozorov, Stanislav (ed.). Ислам на территории бывшей Российской империи: Энциклопедический словарь (in Russian). Moscow: Vostochnaya literatura. pp. 105–108. ISBN 5-02-018047-5.
- Meskhidze, Juliette (1999). "Батал-Хаджжи" [Batal-Hajji] (PDF). In Prozorov, Stanislav (ed.). Ислам на территории бывшей Российской империи: Энциклопедический словарь (in Russian). Moscow: Vostochnaya literatura. pp. 15–16. ISBN 5-02-018137-4.
- Meskhidze, Juliette (2006b). "Батал-Хаджжи" [Batal-Hajji] (PDF). In Prozorov, Stanislav (ed.). Ислам на территории бывшей Российской империи: Энциклопедический словарь (in Russian). Vol. 1. Moscow: Vostochnaya literatura. pp. 56–57. ISBN 5-02-018420-9.
- Khayretdinov, Damir (2009). Ислам в центрально-европейской части России: энциклопедический словарь [Islam in Central European Russia: Encyclopedic Dictionary] (in Russian). Medina. pp. 1–403. ISBN 9785975600547.

=== French sources ===
- Tsaroieva, Mariel (2011). Peuples et religions du Caucase du Nord [Peoples and religions of the North Caucasus] (in French). Paris: Karthala. pp. 1–389. ISBN 9782811104894.
