= Belilovo =

Village in Kaluga Oblast, Russia

Belilovo Белилово
- Village
- Location within Kaluga Oblast Location within Russia
- Coordinates: 54°07′27″N 35°21′18″E
- Country: Russia
- Oblast: Kaluga Oblast
- Raion: Sukhinichsky District
- Rural Settlement: Glazkovo Rural Settlement

Area
  - Total: 0.45 km^{2} (0.17 sq mi)
- Elevation: 195 m (640 ft)

Population (2010)
  - Total: 80
  - Density: 180/km^{2} (460/sq mi)
- Postal code: 249268

Belilovo (Russian: Белилово) is a village in Sukhinichsky District, Kaluga Oblast, Russia. Administratively, it is part of Glazkovo Rural Settlement.

== Geography ==
Belilovo is located 5 kilometres southwest of Glazkovo, 1.5 kilometres northwest of Kipet and metres northeast of Sukhinichi.

The village is in the Moscow Time (UTC+3)

== History ==
The village is shown on the 1860 and 1872 Schubert Maps.

== Demographics ==
According to the 2002 Russian census, there were 98 residents - 93% were Russian.

According to the 2010 Russian census, there were 80 residents - 40% male and 60% female.
