= Glazkovo Rural Settlement =

Rural settlement in Russia

Glazkovo Rural Settlement Глазково сельское поселение
- rural settlement
- Interactive map of Glazkovo Rural Settlement
- Glazkovo Rural Settlement within Kaluga Oblast
- Coordinates: 54°10′26″N 35°23′11″E
- Country: Russia
- Province (Oblast): Kaluga Oblast
- District: Sukhinichsky District
- Established: November 1, 2004
- Former seat: Glazkovo

Area
  - Total: 47.49 km^{2} (18.34 sq mi)

Population (2021)
  - Total: 287
  - Density: 6.04/km^{2} (15.7/sq mi)
- Time zone: UTC+3

Glazkovo Rural Settlement is a Rural settlement in Sukhinichsky District of the Kaluga Oblast in western Russia. The Glazkovo Rural Settlement contains 7 settlements, and has its administrative centre at Glazkovo.

== Geography ==
The Glazkovo Rural Settlement is located in the central area of Kaluga Oblast.

== History ==
The Glazkovo Rural Settlement was established on November 1, 2004.

== Population ==
- 2010 - 289
- 2012 - 299
- 2013 - 293
- 2014 - 291
- 2015 - 284
- 2016 - 266
- 2017 - 275
- 2018 - 275
- 2019 - 274
- 2020 - 270
- 2021 - 287

== List of settlements ==
- Belilovo
- Glazkovo
- Kipet
- Kolskoye
- Kostino
- Protasovo
- Zherdevo
