= Surkhakhi =

Rural locality in Ingushetia

Surkhakhi Сурхахи
- Selo

Other transcription(s)
  - Ingush: СурхотӀе (Note: • Commonly mentioned as 'Surkhothe' (Ingush: СурхотIе), however the village was sometimes mentioned as 'Surkhokhathe' (Ingush: СурхохатIе) or 'Surkho-Khithe' (Ingush: Сурхо-Хитӏе).)
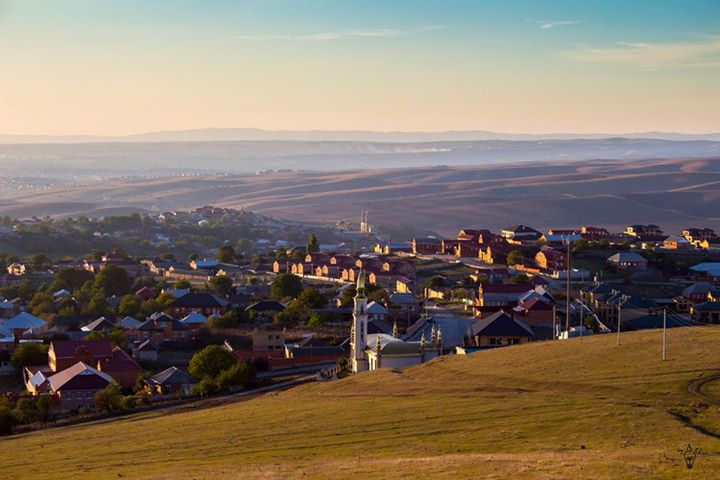
- Interactive map of Surkhakhi
- Location of Surkhakhi Surkhakhi (Republic of Ingushetia)
- Coordinates: 43°11′16″N 44°54′13″E
- Country: Russia
- Federal subject: Ingushetia
- Founded: 1836
- Elevation: 651 m (2,136 ft)

Population (2010 Census)
  - Total: 10 628
  - Estimate (2021): 13 153

Administrative status
  - Subordinated to: Nazranovsky District
- Time zone: UTC+3 (MSK)
- Postal code: 386124
- OKTMO ID: 26605445101

Surkhakhi (Ingush: СурхотӀе, romanized: Surkhothe) is a rural locality (a selo) in Nazranovsky District of the Republic of Ingushetia, Russia. It forms the municipality of the rural settlement of Surkhakhi as the only settlement in its composition.

== Geography ==
The village is located on the left bank of the Kench River, 9 km southeast of the regional center - the city of Nazran and 9 km northeast of the city of Magas .

The nearest settlements: in the south-west — the city of Magas and the village of Ali-Yurt, in the west — the village of Ekazhevo, in the north-west — the village of Gazi-Yurt, in the north — the village of Yandare, in the north-east — the village of Nesterovskaya, in the east — the village of Alkhasty and in the southeast - the village of Galashki.

== History ==
The village of Surkhakhi was founded in 1836. According to one of the official versions, on the territory, including the village of Surkhakhi, there was the ancient city of Magas — the capital of the medieval polyethnic state of Alania, which also included the territory of modern Ingushetia. In this version, we are talking about the complex of ancient settlements "Yandare - Gazi-Yurt - Ekazhevo - Ali-Yurt - Surkhakhi", which are a single fortified area of early medieval fortresses and many settlements between them. More than 30 settlements, numerous settlements, connecting them with defensive ditches and funerary monuments of the Alanian period were recorded in this area.

In July 1919, when Ingushetia was under the rule of Denikin's forces and the people of Surkhakhi left the village, Mandre Nalgiev with his mother remained in the village. Mandre defended Surkhakhi for 9 days, coming out victorious as the Ingush militants came for help and liberated the village. The villagers also attacked and disarmed a White Guard echelon in Nazran. To suppress the uprising, the command of the volunteer army was forced to withdraw 15 thousand bayonets from the front. In 1927, the chairman of the All-Russian Central Executive Committee, M. I. Kalinin, presented the villagers with a letter of thanks for their active support of the Red Army.

From 1944 to 1958, during the period of the deportation of Chechens and Ingush and the abolition of the Chechen-Ingush ASSR, the village was called Mamison.

=== Archeological finds ===
To date, directly in Surkhakhi, archaeologists have found and recorded: 1.5 km west of the village "Surkhahin settlement No. 1" — "Khatoy boarz", 1.7 km west of the village, 200 meters "near an artificial pond in the Erz-Eli tract — "Surkhakhinsky settlement No. 2", 50 m from it "Surkhakhinsky settlement No. 3", 1.5-2 km north-west of the village on the left bank of the Kench River Surkhakhinsky settlement No. 4" — "Ters vakha chu", 1 km to the east of the village "Surkhakhinsky settlement No. 5, to the south-west of the village "Surkhakhinsky settlement No. 6, to the west of the village "Surkhahinsk settlement No. 7" — "Arapkha boarzash", 1.5 km south-east of the village "Surkhakhinskoe settlement No. 8" — "Daka am Kerte", 2.5 km south-west of the village "Surkhahinskoe settlement No. 9" - "Khoriy bose", part of the village near the former farm "Surkhakhinsky settlement No. 10" — "Ehka boarz", 3-4 km southeast of the village "Surkhakha settlement No. 11" — "Shin ken duk".

== Notable people ==
- Batal Hajji Belkhoroev, an Ingush sheikh of the Qadiriyya Sufi order who founded an independent wird that spread among the Ingush and the Chechens.
- Mandre Nalgiev, an Ingush sniper and avenger.

== Bibliography ==
- Ужахов, М. Г. (1927). Ингушско-русский словарик [Ingush-Russian dictionary] (in Ingush and Russian). Владикавказ: Крайнациздат. pp. 1–185.
- Волкова, Н. Г. (1974). Этнический состав населения Северного Кавказа в XVIII — начале XX века [Ethnic composition of the population of the North Caucasus in the 18th - early 20th centuries] (in Russian). Москва: Наука. pp. 1–276.
- Барахоева, Н. М.; Кодзоев, Н. Д.; Хайров, Б. А. (2016). Ингушско-русский словарь терминов [Ingush-Russian dictionary of terms] (in Ingush and Russian) (2 ed.). Нальчик: ООО «Тетраграф». pp. 1–288.
- Кодзоев, Н. Д. (2021). Хайрова, Р. Р. (ed.). Русско-ингушский словарь [Russian-Ingush dictionary] (in Ingush and Russian). Ростов-на-Дону. pp. 1–656. ISBN 978-5-906785-55-8.
- Мальсагов, З. К. (1963). Оздоева, Ф. (ed.). Грамматика ингушского языка [Grammar of the Ingush language] (in Ingush and Russian). Vol. 5 (2nd ed.). Грозный: Чечено-Ингушское Книжное Издательство. pp. 1–164.
- Оздоев, И. А. (1980). Оздоева, Ф. Г.; Куркиев, А. С. (eds.). Русско-ингушский словарь: 40 000 слов [Russian-Ingush dictionary: 40,000 words] (in Ingush and Russian). Москва: Русский язык. pp. 1–832.
- Кодзоев, Н. Д. (2001). "Местонахождение и значение названия аланской столицы города Магас" [Location and meaning of the name of the Alanian capital city of Magas]. Вестник Археологического центра (in Russian) (1). Назрань: 43–52.
- Яндиева, М. Д.; Мальсагов, А. Д. (2007). Государственный террор в Ингушетии в 20 - 50-е годы XX века. Исследование и Мартирологи [State terror in Ingushetia in the 20-50s of the 20th century. Research and Martyrology] (in Russian). Москва: ООО «Алмаз». pp. 1–272. ISBN 978-5-94824-096-1.
- Месхидзе, Дж. И. (1998). "Чечено-Ингушетия" [Checheno-Ingushetia]. In Прозоров, С. М. (ed.). Ислам на территории бывшей Российской империи. Энциклопедический словарь. Выпуск 1 [Islam in the territory of the former Russian Empire. Encyclopedic Dictionary. 1st issue] (in Russian). Москва: Издательская фирма «Восточная литература» РАН. pp. 105–108. ISBN 5-02-018047-5.
- Месхидзе, Дж. И. (1999). "Батал-Хаджжи" [Batal-Hajji]. In Прозоров, С. М. (ed.). Ислам на территории бывшей Российской империи. Энциклопедический словарь. Выпуск 2 [Islam in the territory of the former Russian Empire. Encyclopedic Dictionary. 2nd issue] (in Russian). Москва: Издательская фирма «Восточная литература» РАН. pp. 15–16. ISBN 5-02-018137-4.
- Лысцева, И. В. (2015). "Русская православная церковь и ссыльные горцы Северного Кавказа в Центрально-Европейской части России в середине XIX — начала XX вв." [The Russian Orthodox Church and the exiled highlanders of the North Caucasus in the Central European part of Russia in the middle of the 19th - early 20th centuries]. In Казак, М. А.; Катина, Т. Д.; Заикин, С. М.; Воронин, И. В. (eds.). У истоков российской государственности [At the origins of Russian statehood] (PDF). «Калужские страницы» (in Russian). Калуга: «Эйдос». pp. 185–209.
- Zelkina, Anna (2019-07-19). "Batal Hajji Belkhoroev". In Fleet, Kate; Krämer, Gudrun; Matringe, Denis; Nawas, John; Rowson, Everett (eds.). Encyclopaedia of Islam (3rd ed.). Brill Online. ISSN 1873-9830.
