= Sukhinichsky Okrug =

Administrative unit in the Russian SFSR

Sukhinichsky Okrug Сухиничский округ (Russian)
- District
- Country: Russia
- Federal subject: Western Oblast
- Established: October 1, 1929
- Abolished: July 30, 1930
- Administrative center: Sukhinichi

Area
  - Total: 13,693 km^{2} (5,287 sq mi)

Population
  - Estimate (1926): 651,055

The Sukhinichsky Okrug was an administrative division of the Western Oblast of Russia between 1929 and 1930.

The Okrug was founded on October 1, 1929, with the town of Sukhinichi as its centre.

The Okrug was divided into 11 districts including Sukhinichsky District.

According to the Explanatory Note to the Annual Report on Agriculture for 1928/1928 in the Sukhinichsky District, the area was 13,693 km^{2} and included 4,155 settlements and 456 village councils, with a total number of 119,742 peasant farms. The Okrug also had a population of 680,000, of which 23,000 were urban and 657,000 were rural.

The Okrug was abolished on July 30, 1930, and was transferred to direct ownership by Western Oblast.
