= Mykhailo Panin =

Ukrainian-Russian Artist

Mykhailo Mykytovych Panin
- Born: June 4, 1877; Protasovo, Kaluga Oblast, Russian Empire
- Died: December 20, 1963 (aged 86); Dnipropetrovsk, Ukrainian SSR
- Burial place: Vagankovo Cemetery, Moscow, Russia
- Citizenship: Russia, Ukraine
- Education: Imperial Academy of Arts
- Occupation: Artist
- Years active: 1902–1958

Mykhailo Mykytovych Panin (June 4, 1877 - December 20, 1963) was a Ukrainian-Russian Soviet artist, and honoured artist of the Ukrainian Soviet Socialist Republic.

== Biography ==
Panin was born on June 4, 1877, in the village of Protasovo in Kaluga Oblast, Russia to a peasant family.

Panin studied at the Imperial Academy of Arts in Saint Petersburg from 1902 - 1911, where he was taught by Ilya Repin and Franz Roubaud.

Panin painted the church at the Imperial Russian Mission in Bucharest in 1908. He graduated from the Academy of Arts in 1911.

Panin painted mosaics for the Putilov Factory and the Military Historical Museum of Artillery, Engineers and Signal Corps in Petrograd during the 1920s.

Panin moved to Dnipropetrovsk in 1925, where he taught at the Dnipropetrovsk Art School. He taught artist Fedir Shevchenko, and worked there until 1958.

Panin's 1911 painting The Secret Departure of Ivan the Terrible Before the Oprichnina was taken from the Dnipropetrovsk Art Museum, where it had been since 1914 during World War II but was found in Connecticut, United States in 2017 and returned to Ukraine.

Panin died on December 20, 1963, in Dnipropetrovsk. He was buried in the Vagankovo Cemetery in Moscow.

== Works ==
- The Secret Departure of Ivan the Terrible Before the Oprichnina (1911)
- Storming the Post Office (1927)
- The Shooting of the Workers of the Bryansk Plant (1928)
- Capture of an Armoured Car from the Haydamaks (1929)
- Portrait of Ilya Repin (1947)
- Portrait of Pavel Chistyakov (1947)
- Portrait of a Woman (1954)
- Self Portrait (1954)

The works are stored at the Dnipro Art Museum.
