= Novodanylivka =

Novodanylivka may refer to:

- Novodanylivka, Kirovohrad Oblast
- Novodanylivka, Kazanka settlement hromada, Bashtanka Raion, Mykolaiv Oblast
- Novodanylivka, Vilne Zaporizhzhia rural hromada, Bashtanka Raion, Mykolaiv Oblast
- Novodanylivka, Melitopol Raion, Zaporizhzhia Oblast
- Novodanylivka, Polohy Raion, Zaporizhzhia Oblast
