= Kolski =

Kolski may refer to:

- Allan Kolski Horwitz (born 1952), South African poet
- Grażyna Błęcka-Kolska (born 1962), Polish actress
- Jakub Kolski (1899–1941), Polish chess master
- Jan Jakub Kolski (born 1956), Polish film director, cinematographer, and writer
- Joe Hernandez-Kolski, American actor
- Koło County (powiat kolski), a powiat in Poland
- Kolski, alternative spelling of Kolsky
