= Bolshekolpanskoye Rural Settlement =

Bolshekolpanskoye Rural Settlement Большеколпанское сельское поселение
- rural settlement
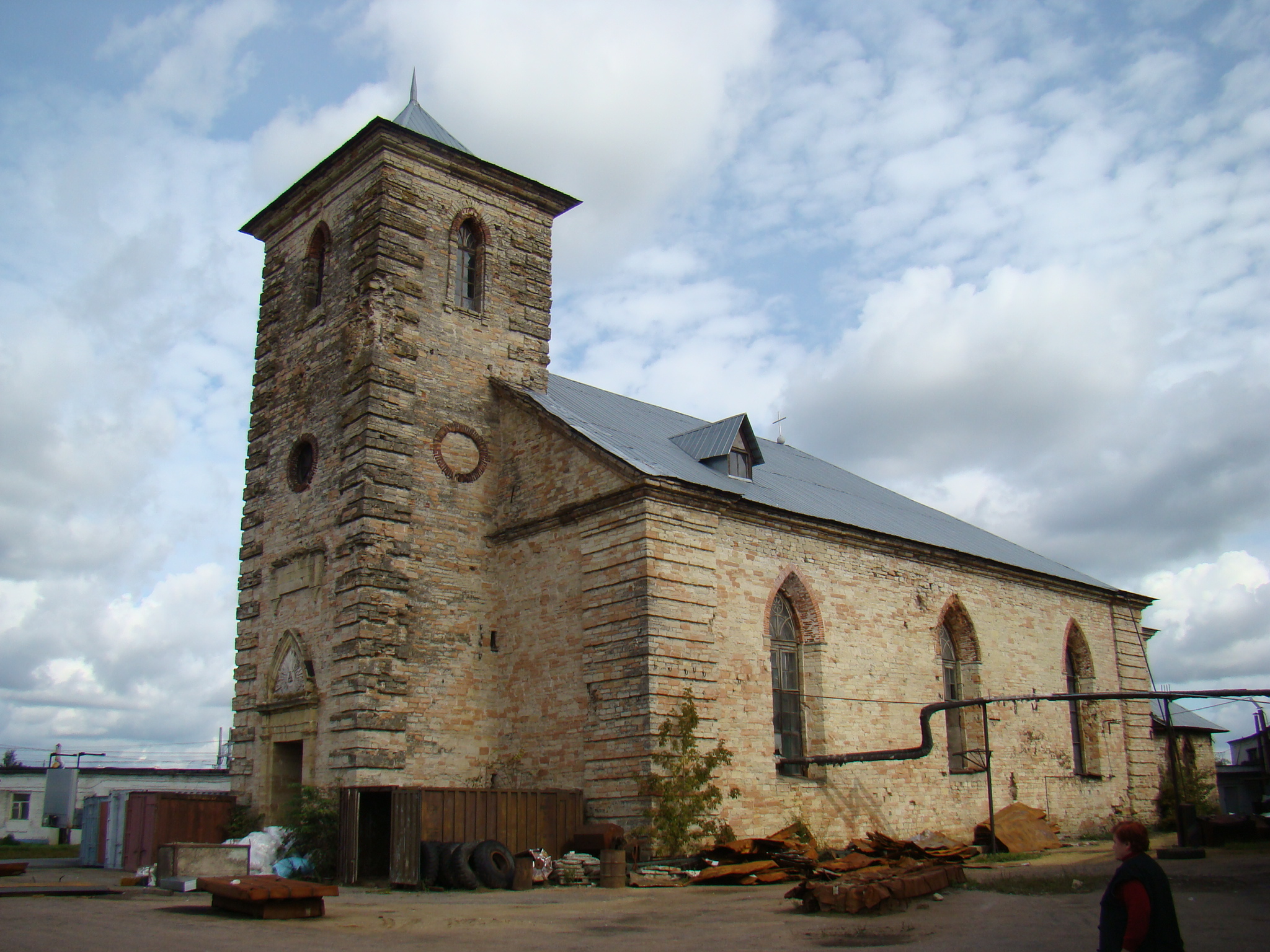
- Church in the village of Malye Kolpany

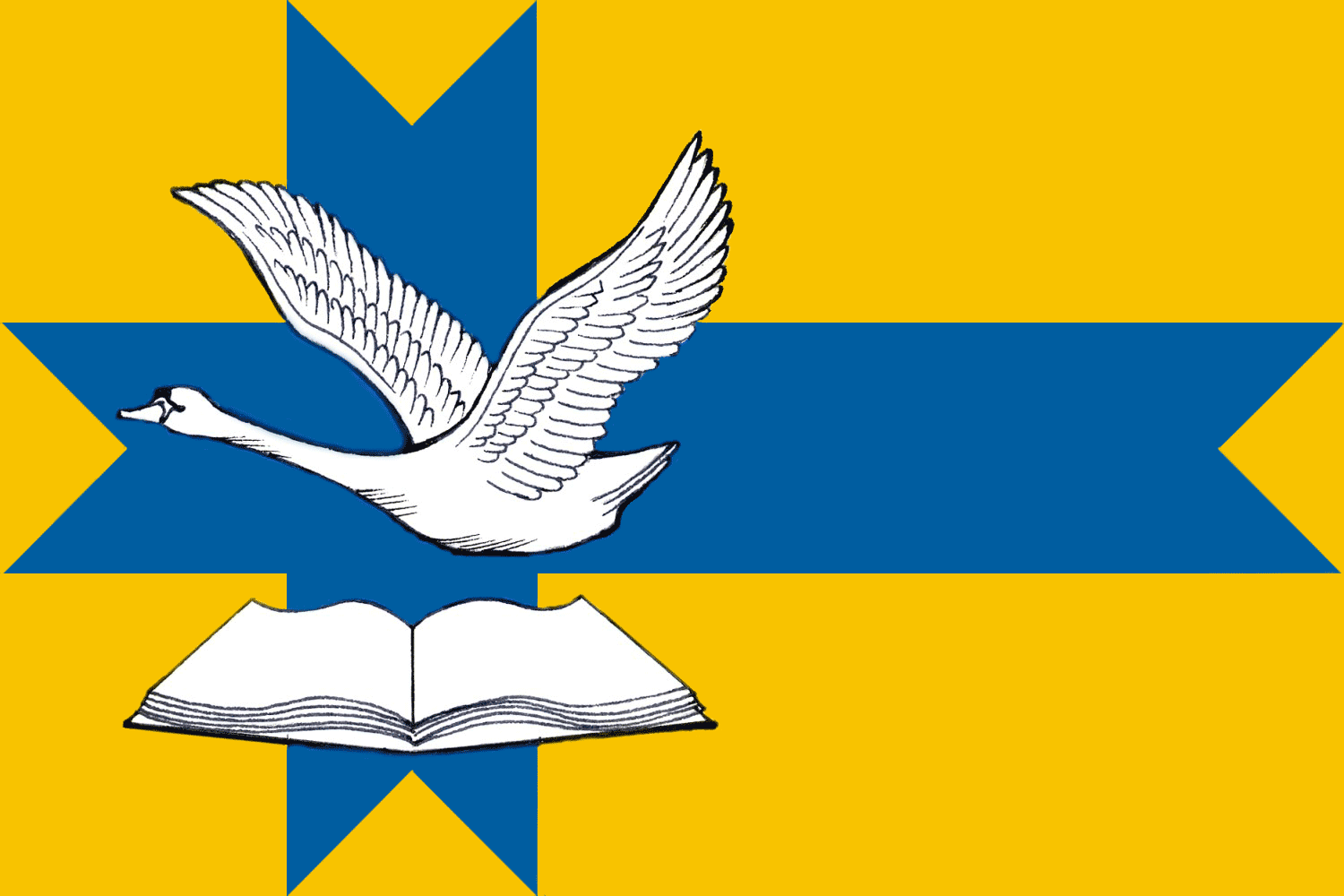
- Flag Coat of arms

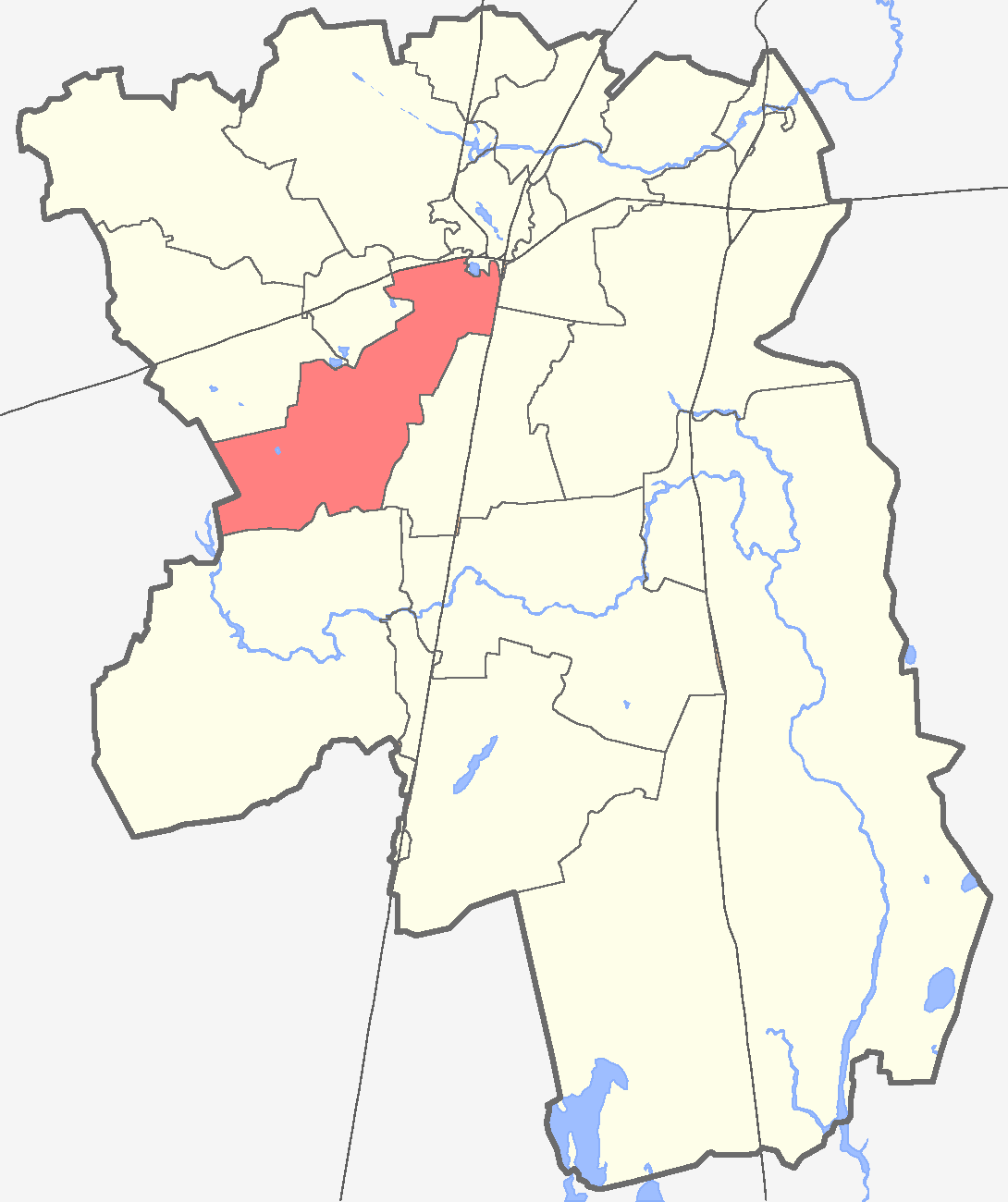
- Bolshekolpanskoye Rural Settlement within Gatchina District

- Bolshekolpanskoye Rural Settlement within Leningrad Oblast (Leningrad Province)
- Coordinates: 59°31′30″N 30°04′00″E
- Country: Russia
- Province (Oblast): Leningrad
- Municipal District: Gatchina
- Created as (Soviet) village council: 1973
- Reconstituted as parish: 1994
- Reconstituted as rural settlement: January 1, 2006
- Administrative center: Great Kolpany

Area
  - Total: 157 km^{2} (61 sq mi)

Population (2014)
  - Total: 9,782
  - Density: 62.3/km^{2} (161/sq mi)
- Time zone: Moscow Time (UTC+03:00)
- Website: kolpany.gatchina.ru

Bolshekolpanskoye Rural Settlement is a rural settlement in Gatchina Municipal District of the Leningrad Oblast in northern Russia. The Bolshekolpanskoye Rural Settlement contains 16 villages. (Note: Actually the village of Nikolskoye is a selo (Russian: село), the others are villages (Russian: деревня); both terms translate to "village", the traditional difference being that selos have a church. The village of Great Kolpany, with a population over 4,000 (2012) would usually be called a "town" in most of the English-speaking world, but Russian does not distinguish between cities and towns (both are called "gorod" (Russian: город)) and criteria for town/city status is higher (12,000 inhabitants, usually).) The administrative center is the village of Bolshiye Kolpany (Great Kolpany).

== Geography ==
The Bolshekolpanskoye Rural Settlement is near the center of the Gatchina District, bordered on the north by the Pudostskoye Rural Settlement, on the north-east by the Novyi Svet Rural Settlement and the City of Gatchina, on the east by the Kobrin Rural Settlement, on the south by the Rozhdestvenskoye Rural Settlement, on the south-west by Volosovsky Municipal District, on the west by the Elizavetinskoye Rural Settlement, and on the north-west by the Voyskovitskoye Rural Settlement.

The Bolshekolpanskoye Rural Settlement covers 157 square kilometres (61 sq mi). From Great Kolpany to the Gatchina District center is 8.5 kilometres (5.3 mi). The following highways run through the Settlement:

- M20 (R23 highway) which runs from St. Petersburg through Pskov to the Belarusian border. This highway is part of European Route E95 .
- A120 , the St. Petersburg Southern Ring Road, running Serovo – Kirovsk – Bolshaya Izhora
- P-38, running Gatchina – Opole

=== Geology ===
The Bolshekolpanskoye Rural Settlement is located on the Izhora Plateau, thus there are very few ponds or lakes in its area. The largest ponds are artificial ones which have resulted from the infilling of stone quarries in Paritsa and Bornitskaya. The Rural Settlement includes the headwaters of Sivoritsky Creek, which joins the Suyda River at the village of Paritsa.

The presence on the plateau of limestone and dolomite, creating a karst landscape, has led to the formation of large karst caves. These caves, which are sealed off from the atmosphere, were used beginning in Soviet times for the storage of natural gas reserves.

== History ==
The area of the Bolshekolpanskoye Rural Settlement was part of the heartland of Ingria, home of the pre-Russian Izhorians and Votes, peoples who are now on the brink of extinction.

In 1973, under the Soviet Union, the Bolshekolpanskoye Village Council was formed as part of the Gatchina District (Gatchina Raion).

On January 18, 1994, by Order Number 10 ("On Changes in the Administrative-Territorial Districts of the Leningrad Region") of the Leningrad Region (Leningrad Oblast), the Bolshekolpanskoye Village Council was redesignated as Bolshekolpanskoye Parish (the other village councils in the District were likewise redesignated by this order).

On January 1, 2006, in accordance with Regional Law Number 133–OZ of December 16, 2004, Bolshekolpanskoye Parish was redesignated as Bolshekolpanskoye Rural Settlement.

== Population ==
Year	2006	2010	2011	2012	2013	2014	2015
Population	9000	9327	9333	9405	9567	9657	9782

== Economy ==
The Bolshekolpanskoye Rural Settlement contains 85 industrial or service enterprises (as of 2015), the largest being the Gatchina Company, which owns more than a third of the Settlement (57.28 square kilometres (22.12 sq mi)) and which is mainly engaged in agricultural production – dairy farming, potatoes, vegetables. The Gatchina Feed Mill, in the village of Malye Kolpany (Lesser Kolpany), is one of Russia's largest producers of animal feed.

The caverns in the karst continue to be used to store natural gas. There are also active dolomite quarries. The Settlement also contains various small businesses, engaged in pursuits such as trade, personal services, repair and maintenance of motor vehicles, and so forth. The Sivoritsy Airfield is located in the village of Nikolskoye.

== Constituent communities ==
Number	Locality	Type of locality	Population (2012)
1	Bolshiye Kolpany	Village, administrative center	4,095
2	Vakkolovo	Village	32
3	Vopsha	Village	156
4	Korpisalovo	Village	122
5	Lyadino	Village	61
6	Malye Kolpany	Village	462
7	Nikolskoye	Village (Selo)	2,882
8	New Koleno	Village	31
9	New Hinkolovo	Village	20
10	New Chernitsov	Village	46
11	Paritsa	Village	243
12	Rotkovo	Village	39
13	Old Hinkolovo	Village	25
14	Old Chernitsov	Village	29
15	Tihkovitsy	Village	241
16	Himozi	Village	425
