= Seredeysky =

Urban locality in Kaluga Oblast, Russia

Coordinates: 54°03′02″N 35°13′56″E

Seredeysky (Russian: Середейский) is an urban-type settlement in Sukhinichsky District, Kaluga Oblast, Russia. Population: 1,766 (2021 census); 1,819 (2010 census); 1,948 (2002 census); 2,522 (1989 Soviet census).
