= Glazkovo, Kaluga Oblast =

Village in Kaluga Oblast, Russia

Glazkovo Глазково
- Village
- Location within Kaluga Oblast Location within Russia
- Coordinates: 54°10′26″N 35°23′11″E
- Country: Russia
- Oblast: Kaluga Oblast
- Raion: Sukhinichsky District
- Rural Settlement: Glazkovo Rural Settlement

Area
  - Total: 0.27 km^{2} (0.10 sq mi)
- Elevation: 191 m (627 ft)

Population (2010)
  - Total: 145
  - Density: 540/km^{2} (1,400/sq mi)
- Postal code: 249268

Glazkovo (Russian: Глазково) is a village in Sukhinichsky District, Kaluga Oblast, Russia. Administratively, it is part of Glazkovo Rural Settlement.

== Geography ==
Glazkovo is located 1.7 kilometres northeast of Kolskoye, 1.4 kilometres northeast of Protasovo, 1 kilometre southwest of Zherdevo, and 6 kilometres northeast of Sukhinichi.

The village is in the Moscow Time (UTC+3)

== History ==
The village is shown on the 1860 and 1872 Schubert Maps.

== Demographics ==
According to the 2002 Russian census, there were 159 residents - 94% were Russian.

According to the 2010 Russian census, there were 145 residents - 48% male and 51% female.
