= Dnipro Theatre and Art College =

Theatre and art college in Dnipro, Ukraine

- Type: Art School
- Established: May 29, 1997
- Location: Korolevy Elyzabety II Street, 11, Dnipro, Ukraine
- Campus: Urban

The Dnipro Theatre and Art College is a higher education college in Dnipro, Ukraine.

== History ==
The college was founded on May 29, 1997, by a merger of the Dnipropetrovsk Art School and the Dnipropetrovsk Theatre School.

The college was headed by Mykola Karpenko from 1997 to 2013.
