= Fedir Shevchenko =

Ukrainian Artist

Fedir Fedorovych Shevchenko
- Born: July 24, 1924; Novodanylivka, Orikhiv Raion, Zaporizhzhia Oblast, Ukrainian SSR
- Died: September 1, 1980 (aged 56); Zaporizhzhia, Zaporizhzhia Oblast, Ukrainian SSR
- Education: Dnipropetrovsk Art School
- Occupation: Artist
- Years active: 1950–1977

Fedir Fedorovych Shevchenko (July 24, 1924 – September 1, 1980) was a Ukrainian artist. He was a member of the National Union of Artists of Ukraine.

== Biography ==
Shevchenko was born on July 24, 1924, in the village of Novodanylivka, near Orikhiv in Zaporizhzhia Oblast. He studied at the Zaporizhzhia Palace of Pioneers under the guidance of I. F. Fedianin. He graduated from the Dnipropetrovsk Art School in 1950.

Shevchenko joined the Communist Party of the Soviet Union in 1966. He was elected chairman of the board of the Zaporizhzhia section of the Union of Artists of Ukraine in 1965 - a position which he held until 1977.

Shevchenko died in Zaporizhzhia on September 1, 1980.

== Works ==
- In the Collective Farm Yard (1959)
- Countrymen (1963–1964)
- Labor Watch (1965)
- Zaporizhzhia Steelworkers (1965–1967)
- The Calf (1966–1967)
- Farewell to the Leader (1969)
- Builders of the Dnipro Hydroelectric Power Plant (1969–1970)
- Volley of Victory (1970)
- Portrait of the builder of the Dnipro Hydroelectric Station, K. Trut (1970)
- On the Front Roads (1975)

All of these works are kept at the Zaporizhzhia Art Museum.
