= Mandre Nalgiev =

Ingush sniper

Mandre Nalgiev Налганаькъан Мандре
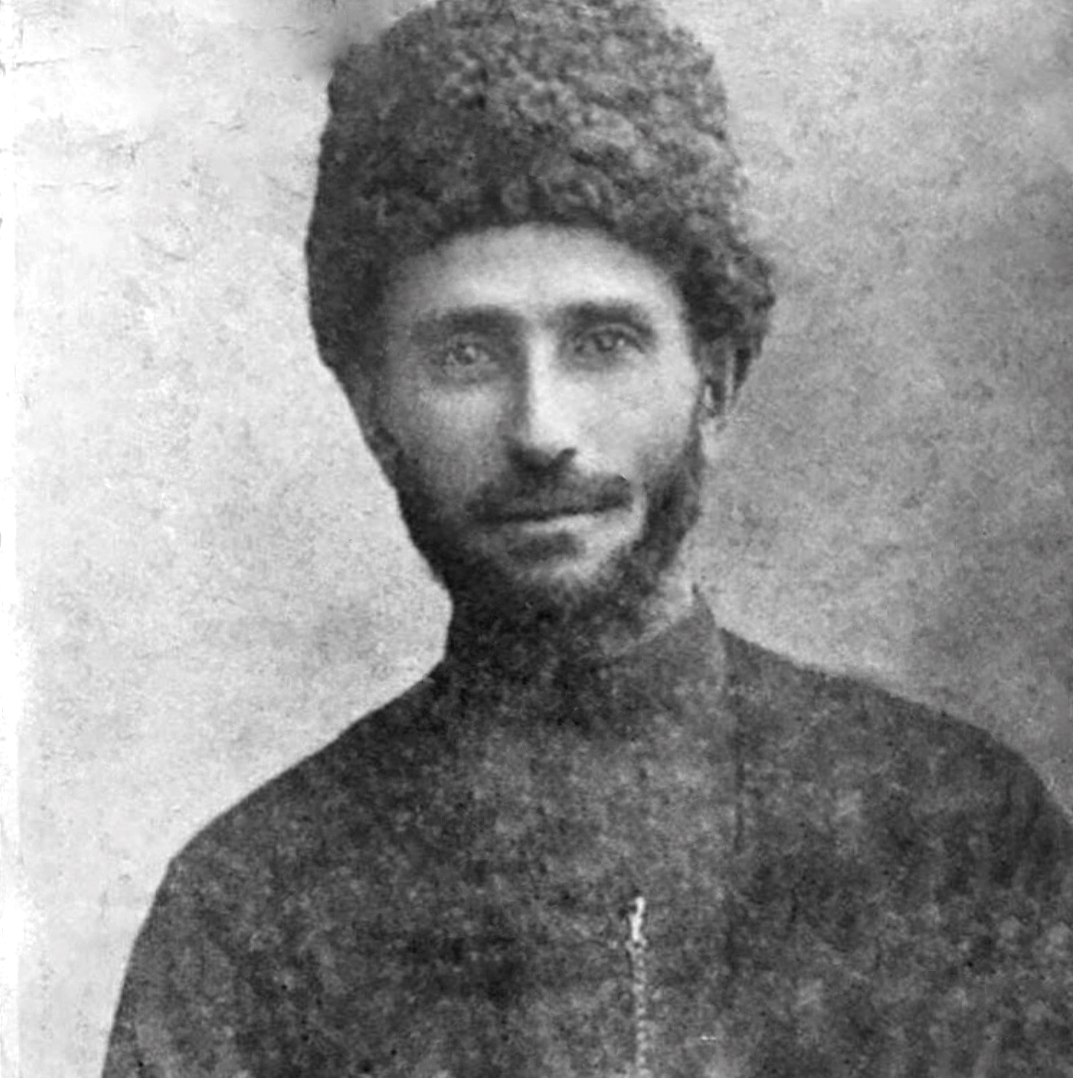
- Born: 1865; Surkhakhi, Terek Oblast, Russian Empire
- Died: 1924 (aged 58–59)
- Occupations: Sniper, separatists
- Years active: 1919
- Known for: Defending his native village Surkhakhi from Denikin's troops during his campaign in Ingushetia

Mandre Doltmurzievich Nalgiev (Note: Russian: Мандре Долтмурзиевич Нальгиев, Ingush: Налганаькъан Долтмарзий Мандре, romanized: Nal'ganeaq'an Mandre) (c. 1865 – 1924) was an Ingush freedom fighter in the Russian Civil War, known for defending his native village Surkhakhi from the troops of Denikin's Forces during his campaign in Ingushetia. Mandre belonged to the Nal'ganeaq'an clan and is the national hero of the Ingush.

== Biography ==
Mandre was born in 1865 in Surkhakhi, in Terek Oblast and was an ethnic Ingush. He became a sniper not because of his motives, but because of the circumstances of his life.

A revolution began in Tsarist Russia, a confrontation between the Reds and the Whites, a fire of revolution broke out throughout the Empire, and the regions of the North Caucasus were no exception.

In 1919, the army of General Denikin came close to the Ingush village of Surkhot (Surkhakhi) and subjected it to powerful artillery shelling.

The villagers put up fierce resistance. After a two-day battle, the surviving residents left the village and went to the mountains.

At this time, Mandre remains in the village, armed with a rifle, pistol and binoculars. With him in the village (despite Mandre's persuasion to leave the village along with the retreating ones), his mother also remains.

Mandre waged a guerrilla war against Russian troops for nine days. As a result, Ingush armed units came to Surkhakhi and liberated the village. Mandre's mother, who also refused to leave the captured village, was killed by an artillery shell.
