= Dnipropetrovsk Theatre School =

Theatre school in Dnipro, Ukraine (1939–1997)

- Type: Theatre School
- Active: 1939–May 29, 1997
- Location: Dnipropetrovsk, Ukraine
- Campus: Urban

The Dnipropetrovsk Theatre School was a theatre school in Dnipropetrovsk, Ukraine.

== History ==
The Dnipropetrovsk Theatre School was founded in 1939 by Ivan Siryk from the theatre faculty of the Dnipro Academy of Music of 1930.

The school trained actors of the theatre, and during the 1950s and 1960s choreographic groups.

The school closed on May 29, 1997, when it was merged with the Dnipropetrovsk Art School to form the Dnipro Theatre and Art College.
