= Kolsky =

Kolsky (masculine), Kolskaya (feminine), or Kolskoye (neuter) may refer to:

- Kola Peninsula (Kolsky poluostrov), a peninsula in Russia
- Kolsky District, a district of Murmansk Oblast, Russia
- Kolsky Uyezd, an administrative division (an uyezd) of the Tsardom of Russia and later of the Russian Empire
- Karel Kolský (1914–1984), a Czech soccer player
- Kolskaya (jack-up rig), a 3-leg type jack-up oil exploration platform that sank in 2011 in the Sea of Okhotsk
- Kola Nuclear Power Plant (Kolskaya AES), a nuclear power plant in Russia
- Kolskoye, a rural locality (a village) in Kaluga Oblast, Russia
