= Kostino, Republic of Bashkortostan =

Kostino Костино
- Village
- Location within Bashkortostan Location within Russia
- Coordinates: 56°12′N 54°53′E
- Country: Russia
- Region: Bashkortostan
- District: Yanaulsky District
- Time zone: UTC+5:00

Kostino (Russian: Костино) is a rural locality (a village) in Pevomaysky Selsoviet, Yanaulsky District, Bashkortostan, Russia. The population was 158 as of 2010. There are 4 streets.

== Geography ==
Kostino is located 11 km southwest of Yanaul (the district's administrative centre) by road. Susady-Ebalak is the nearest rural locality.
