= Kostino, Sobinsky District, Vladimir Oblast =

Kostino Костино
- Village
- Location within Vladimir Oblast Location within Russia
- Coordinates: 56°00′N 40°13′E
- Country: Russia
- Region: Vladimir Oblast
- District: Sobinsky District
- Time zone: UTC+3:00

Kostino (Russian: Костино) is a rural locality (a village) in Aserkhovskoye Rural Settlement, Sobinsky District, Vladimir Oblast, Russia. The population was 4 as of 2010.

== Geography ==
Kostino is located 15 km east of Sobinka (the district's administrative centre) by road. Vyshmanovo is the nearest rural locality.
