= Kostino, Petushinsky District, Vladimir Oblast =

Kostino Костино
- Village
- Location within Vladimir Oblast Location within Russia
- Coordinates: 55°59′N 39°21′E
- Country: Russia
- Region: Vladimir Oblast
- District: Petushinsky District
- Time zone: UTC+3:00

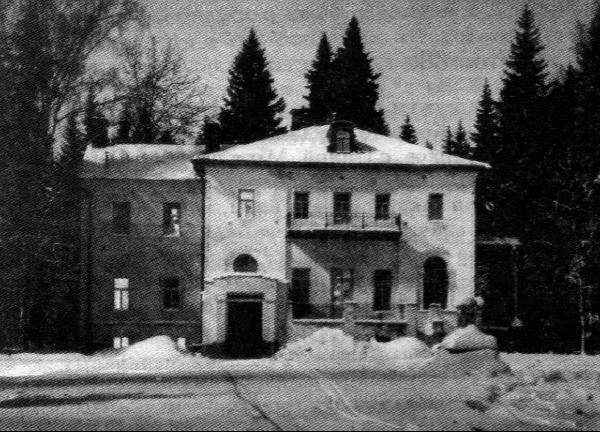
An old estate in Kostino

Kostino (Russian: Костино) is a rural locality (a village) in Petushinskoye Rural Settlement, Petushinsky District, Vladimir Oblast, Russia. The population was 909 as of 2010. There are 17 streets.

== Geography ==
Kostino is located 18 km northwest of Petushki (the district's administrative centre) by road. Popinovo is the nearest rural locality.
