= Dnipropetrovsk Art School =

Art school in Dnipro, Ukraine (1925–1997)

- Type: Art school
- Active: 1925–May 29, 1997
- Location: Dnipropetrovsk, Ukraine

The Dnipropetrovsk Art School was an art school in Dnipropetrovsk, Ukraine.

== History ==
The Art School was founded in 1925 by artists Mykhailo Panin and Stepan Slobodianiuk-Podolian as an art workshop. The workshop became a college in 1929. A sculpture department was opened in the college in 1930. It became the Dnipropetrovsk State Art College in 1935.

The college closed upon the start of World War II. It reopened in 1943, and opened a department of art decoration in 1966.

The art college was merged on May 29, 1997, with the Dnipropetrovsk Theatre School to be transformed into the Dnipro Theatre and Art College.
