= Kostino, Podlesny Selsoviet, Vologodsky District, Vologda Oblast =

Kostino Костино
- Village
- Location within Vologda Oblast Location within Russia
- Coordinates: 59°04′N 40°00′E
- Country: Russia
- Region: Vologda Oblast
- District: Vologodsky District
- Time zone: UTC+3:00

Kostino (Russian: Костино) is a rural locality (a village) in Podlesnoye Rural Settlement, Vologodsky District, Vologda Oblast, Russia. The population was 6 as of 2002.

== Geography ==
The distance to Vologda is 28 km, to Ogarkovo is 15 km. Vinnikovo, Semyonovskoye, Duravino are the nearest rural localities.
