= Kostino, Gryazovetsky District, Vologda Oblast =

Kostino Костино
- Village
- Location within Vologda Oblast Location within Russia
- Coordinates: 58°48′N 39°58′E
- Country: Russia
- Region: Vologda Oblast
- District: Gryazovetsky District
- Time zone: UTC+3:00

Kostino (Russian: Костино) is a rural locality (a village) in Yurovskoye Rural Settlement, Gryazovetsky District, Vologda Oblast, Russia. The population was 2 as of 2002.

== Geography ==
Kostino is located 24 km (15 mi) southwest of Gryazovets (the district's administrative centre) by road. Bragino is the nearest rural locality.
