= Damir Khayretdinov =

Russian historian (born 1972)

Khayretdinov, Damir Zinyurovich
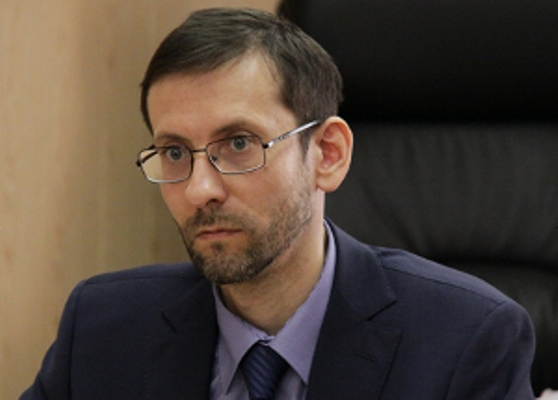
- Born: 10 September 1972 (age 53); Moscow, Russia
- Occupation: Rector of Moscow Islamic University
- Known for: Expert in the indigenous cultures and languages of Russian Muslims and the Tatars
- Scientific career
- Fields: historian, and ethnographer
- Institutions: Moscow Islamic University
- Website: miu.su//

Damir Zinyurovich Khayretdinov (Russian: Дами́р Зиню́рович Хайретди́нов) (born 1972) is a Russian historian, ethnographer and social activist. He is known for his work documenting and studying the indigenous cultures and languages of Russian Tatars. He serves as a rector of Moscow Islamic University and is the consultant of mufti on the Clerical Muslim Board of the Russian Federation.

== Personal life ==
Damir was born In 1972 in Moscow. He graduated from the Russian State University for the Humanities. He received a grade of 'excellent' for the defense of his thesis "The spread of Islam among the Russian Tatars during the second half of 1980 - first half of the 1990". In 2002 he received his Ph.D. from the Institute of Anthropology and Ethnography on the theme: "The history of the Muslim community during the period from the 14th to the 20th century". (His supervisor was Alexeï Malachenko, a member of the Scientific Council of The Carnegie Moscow Center

== Works ==
- The spread of Islam among the Russian Tatars during the 2nd half of 1980 - 1st half of the 1990.
- The history of the Muslim community during the period from the 14th to the 20th century.
