= Kunta-Hajji =

Prominent Sufi Figure

Kunta-Hajji Киши КӀант Кунт-Хьаж
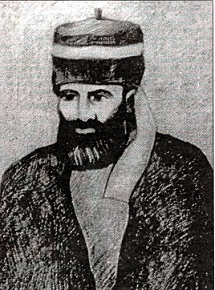
- Title: Sheikh, Hajji, Ustaz

Personal life
- Born: Batal; 1821 Istisu/Ilaskhan-Yurt, (Note: According to one sources, he was born in Istisu. According to other sources, he was born in Ilaskhan-Yurt.) Chechnya
- Died: 1867 (aged 66–67) Ustyuzhna, Novgorod Governorate, Russian Empire
- Home town: Istisu/Ilaskhan-Yurt,
- Parents: Kunta (father); Heda (mother)

Religious life
- Religion: Islam
- Denomination: Sunni
- Tariqa: Qadiri

Muslim leader
- Teacher: Kunta-Haji
- Disciples: Kunta-Hajjis

Kunta-Ḥājjī al-Iliskhānī (Kishiev) (Chechen: Киши КӀант Кунт-Хьаж, romanized: Kishi K'ant Kunt-X́až; (Note: Also referred in Chechen and Ingush languages as Iliskha yurtara x́aža (Илисха юртара хьажа), lit. 'Hajji from Ilaskhan-Yurt'.) c. 1800 – 1867) was a Chechen Muslim mystic, the founder of a Sufi branch named Zikrism, and an ideologue of nonviolence and passive resistance. He was a follower of the Qadiriyya Sufi order.

== Biography ==
Kunta-haji Kishiev (literally son of Kishi) was born in a Chechen lowland village of Isti-Su, also known as Melcha-Khi. Later the family moved to the mountain village of Ilskhan-Yurt in the heartland of Chechnya. In his youth he was distinguished by his hard work and sharp mental senses. Kunta received a solid religious education and was a follower of shaykh Gezi-haji from the village of Zandak. Kunta started practicing Zikr: prayer with rolling and recitation of divine names.

Imam Shamil was worried by the unusual practice and ordered an examination of the Koranic knowledge of the youth. After Kunta passed the examination, Shamil left him alone. By another version of the same legend, Shamil forbade Kunta Zikr and promised to execute him if he continued. Yet another legend tells that Shamil exiled Kunta to Mekka and did not allow him to come back.

By the end of 1850s Kunta made his Hajj (according to Mustafa Eldibiev, Kunta made his first hajj at the age of 18, thus, in 1848). In his travel over the Middle East, Kunta not only visited Mekka but also the tomb of Abdul-Qadir Gilani in Baghdad, and became a devoted follower of Qadiriyyah, the teachings developed by Abdul-Qadir Gilani. Kunta became a strong supporter of non-violence and peace. In the midst of the bloody Caucasian War he wrote to Chechnya from Mekka:

War—it is savagery. Remove yourself from anything that hints of [reminds you of] war if the enemy hasn’t come to take away your faith and honor. Your strength is wisdom, patience, fairness. The enemy will not withstand this strength and sooner or later will admit his defeat. No one will have the strength to defeat you and your truth if you don’t turn away from the path of your faith—the Tariqah.

and

Brothers! Because of the constant wars we are catastrophically diminished in numbers. I do not believe in help from Turkey, that Turkish sultan wants to free and save us. He is the same despot as Russian tsar. Believe me: I saw this by my own eyes as well as covering by sharia despots from Arab countries. Further war is not pleasing God. If they order you to go to the church - go, it is only a building. If they order you to wear crosses - wear them, they are only iron things. You would still be Muslims in your heart and soul. But if they would rape your women, force you to forget your culture and traditions, only then rebel and fight to the last man.
Defeat the evil man by your goodness and love.
Defeat the greedy with your generosity.
Defeat the treacherous with your sincerity.
Defeat the infidel with your fidelity.

After the fall of Shamil, Kunta-haji returned to Chechnya. His teaching became quite popular among people tired by the almost fifty years of the Caucasian war. The number of his murids reached five thousand. Kunta-haji required his murids not only to perform the five required prayers during the day, but also to repeat the prayer La ilaha ill-Allah (There is no god but God) at least one hundred times during the day and participate in the ritual of Loud Circular Zikr.

Despite the fact that Kunta-haji repeatedly rejected the title of imam, he was seen as a threat to the Imperial authorities and the official version of Islam supported by Russian authorities. By the request of the tsar's administration, official Islamic clerics (e.g. Abdulkadyr Khordayev and Mustafa Abdulayev) organized public theological discussions with Kunta-haji trying to prove that his teaching contradicted Islam. Still the influence of Kunta-haji only grew. Considering Kunta-haji as a threat, the Governor-General of Terek ordered his arrest. Kunta-haji and his brother, Movsar, were arrested and taken to Novocherkassk prison in January 1863. The arrest caused the so-called Dagger Uprising (or delo pod Shali), when three thousand of Kunta-haji's murids armed only with the ceremonial daggers tried to free their teacher in Shali. The rebels were dispersed by the regular troops of General Tumanov. 160 rebels were killed.

For a long time there was no information about the fate of Kunta-haji. In 1928 documents were found confirming that Kunta-haji died in exile in the town of Ustyuzhna (then Novgorod Guberniya, now Vologda Oblast).

== The fate of his teaching ==
Despite being originally persecuted and its members often sent to Siberia, the Qadiriyyah Tariqah started in Caucasus by Kunta-haji became the religion of the majority of Chechens (exact estimations vary: 60% or 70-75%). The followers of Kunta-haji believe that their teacher is one of the 360 saints that keep the world alive and that he would return to Earth at a future time. The tomb of Kunta-haji's mother, Kheda, is considered sacred as the spring nearby that is believed to have been started by Kunta-haji pushing his stick into the earth.

The tomb of Kunta-haji's mother, Kheda, became a major cause of the conflict between Wahhabi and Qadiriyyah adherents in the government of Aslan Maskhadov. The Wahhabis wanted to destroy the tomb (as they consider veneration of Kheda as paganism), yet the Qadiriyyahs led by Akhmad Kadyrov (then the Chief Mufti of Chechnya) were able to save the tomb, but the conflict eventually led to Kadyrov's alliance with the Russian government against Maskhadov's government.

== Bibliography ==
- Akhriev, N. G. (1975). "Исконные имена чеченцев и ингушей" [Original names of Chechens and Ingush]. Сборник статей и материалов по вопросам нахского языкознания. Известия ЧИНИИИЯЛ [Collection of articles and materials on questions of Nakh linguistics. Izvestia CHINIIIYAL] (in Russian). Vol. 10 (2nd ed.). Grozny: Chech.-Ing. kn. izd-vo. pp. 199–212.
- Kemper, Michael; Shikhaliev, Shamil (2020a). "Kunta-Ḥājjī". In Fleet, Kate; Krämer, Gudrun; Matringe, Denis; Nawas, John; Rowson, Everett (eds.). Encyclopaedia of Islam (3rd ed.). Brill Online. ISSN 1873-9830.
- Kemper, Michael; Shikhaliev, Shamil (2020b). "Kunta-Ḥājjī and the Stolen Horse". In Sartori, Paolo; Ross, Danielle (eds.). SharīA in the Russian Empire: The Reach and Limits of Islamic Law in Central Eurasia, 1550-1917. Edinburgh: Edinburgh University Press. pp. 281–298. ISBN 9781474444316.
