= Novodanylivka, Polohy Raion, Zaporizhzhia Oblast =

Village in Zaporizhzhia Oblast, Ukraine

Novodanylivka Новоданилівка
- Village
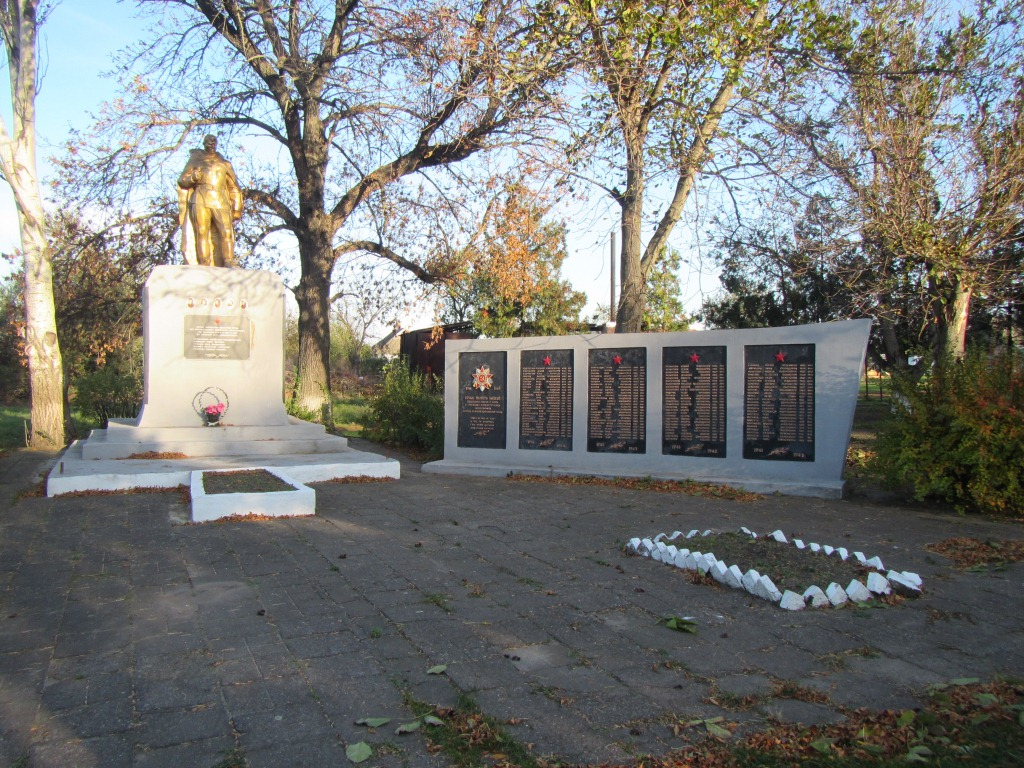
- World War II memorial in the village
- Interactive map of Novodanylivka
- Location of Novodanylivka within Zaporizhzhia Oblast Novodanylivka (Ukraine)
- Coordinates: 47°31′35″N 35°49′0″E
- Country: Ukraine
- Oblast: Zaporizhzhia
- Raion: Polohy
- Hromada: Orikhiv
- Founded: 1879

Area
  - Total: 3.63 km^{2} (1.40 sq mi)
- Elevation: 55 m (180 ft)

Population (2025)
  - Total: 7
- Postal code: 70505

Novodanylivka (Ukrainian: Новодани́лівка), formerly Danylivka (Ukrainian: Дани́лівка) is a village in southern Ukraine, administratively located in Orikhiv urban hromada, Polohy Raion, Zaporizhzhia Oblast. It had a population of 1006 inhabitants in the 2001 Ukrainian census and 7 in 2025.

== Geography ==
Novodanylivka is located 31 kilometres west of Polohy, 2 kilometres southeast of Orikhiv, and 1.5 kilometres southwest of Mala Tokmachka.

== History ==
20 Bronze Age and Copper Age mounds have been preserved in the area of Novodanylivka.

Novodanylivka was founded as Danylivka in 1879 as a settlement of the Russian Empire on the site of meadowlands. The first settler was called Deineha Danylo, where the name Danylivka was named after him.

After the Russian Revolution the village was renamed to Novodanylivka.

The village became part of the Orikhiv urban hromada on November 11, 2016 following the abolition of Novodanylivka Rural Council.

The village became part of Polohy Raion on July 19, 2020, following the abolition of Orikhiv Raion.

During the 2022 Russian invasion of Ukraine phase of the Russo-Ukrainian War, the Russian Ground Forces shelled the village heavily almost daily. By 20 July 2022, 40% of buildings were reportedly destroyed. By 2023, the population had reportedly dropped to 110. As of May 2024, positional fighting was still ongoing in Robotyne, south of Novodanylivka. On 21 November 2025, Russian forces made breakthrough during the mechanized attacks and contested part of the village.

== School ==
The village school was founded in 1887. It had 2 classrooms. The school later expanded to include more classrooms, a library and a workshop. The school was burned down in World War II. The school was rebuilt after the war.

== Transport ==
The N-08 highway passes through the village.

== Demographics ==
Bedore the Russian Revolution, the village had 200 households.

According to the 2001 Ukrainian census, the village had a population of 1006. 96% spoke Ukrainian, and 3% spoke Russian.

The population declined following the 2022 Russian invasion of Ukraine, with the population in 2023 being 110, in 2024 being 13, and in 2025 being 7.

== Famous People ==
- Fedir Shevchenko, Ukrainian Painter
