= Kostino, Sudogodsky District, Vladimir Oblast =

Kostino Костино
- Village
- Location within Vladimir Oblast Location within Russia
- Coordinates: 55°56′N 40°47′E
- Country: Russia
- Region: Vladimir Oblast
- District: Sudogodsky District
- Time zone: UTC+3:00

Kostino (Russian: Костино) is a rural locality (a village) in Muromtsevskoye Rural Settlement, Sudogodsky District, Vladimir Oblast, Russia. The population was 8 as of 2010.

== Geography ==
Kostino is located on the Vanchuga River, 6 km west of Sudogda (the district's administrative centre) by road. Stepachevo is the nearest rural locality.
