= Kostino, Kharovsky District, Vologda Oblast =

Kostino Костино
- Village
- Location within Vologda Oblast Location within Russia
- Coordinates: 60°07′N 40°13′E
- Country: Russia
- Region: Vologda Oblast
- District: Kharovsky District
- Time zone: UTC+3:00

Kostino (Russian: Костино) is a rural locality (a village) in Razinskoye Rural Settlement, Kharovsky District, Vologda Oblast, Russia. The population was 13 as of 2002.

== Geography ==
Kostino is located 36 km north of Kharovsk (the district's administrative centre) by road. Lapikha is the nearest rural locality.
