= Kostino, Vashkinsky District, Vologda Oblast =

Kostino Костино
- Village
- Location within Vologda Oblast Location within Russia
- Coordinates: 60°28′N 37°26′E
- Country: Russia
- Region: Vologda Oblast
- District: Vashkinsky District
- Time zone: UTC+3:00

Kostino (Russian: Костино) is a rural locality (a village) in Porechenskoye Rural Settlement, Vashkinsky District, Vologda Oblast, Russia. The population was 1 as of 2002.

== Geography ==
Kostino is located 60 km northwest of Lipin Bor (the district's administrative centre) by road. Podgornaya is the nearest rural locality.
