= Sukhinichsky District =

Sukhinichsky District Сухиничский район (Russian)
- District
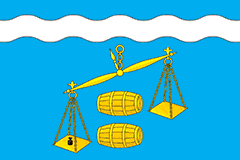
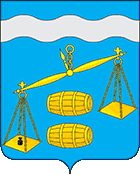
- Flag Coat of arms
- Location of Sukhinichsky District in Kaluga Oblast
- Coordinates: 54°06′N 35°21′E
- Country: Russia
- Federal subject: Kaluga Oblast
- Established: 1 October 1929
- Administrative center: Sukhinichi

Government
  - Type: Local government
  - Head of the Administration: Alexander Stepanovich Kolesnikov

Area
  - Total: 1,232 km^{2} (476 sq mi)

Population (2010 Census)
  - Total: 25,427
  - Estimate (2025): 22,017
  - Density: 20.64/km^{2} (53.45/sq mi)
  - Urban: 71.2%
  - Rural: 28.8%

Administrative structure
  - Inhabited localities: 1 cities/towns, 1 urban-type settlements, 153 rural localities

Municipal structure
  - Municipally incorporated as: Sukhinichsky Municipal District
  - Municipal divisions: 2 urban settlements, 17 rural settlements
- Time zone: UTC+3 (MSK)
- OKTMO ID: 29636000
- Website: http://www.info-suhinichi.ru/

Sukhinichsky District (Russian: Сухиничский райо́н) is an administrative and municipal district (raion), one of the twenty-four in Kaluga Oblast, Russia. It is located in the center of the oblast. The area of the district is 1,232 square kilometers (476 sq mi). Its administrative center is the town of Sukhinichi. Population: 22,959 (2021 census); 25,427 (2010 census); 26,968 (2002 Census); 31,369 (1989 Soviet census). The population of Sukhinichi accounts for 64.5% of the district's total population.

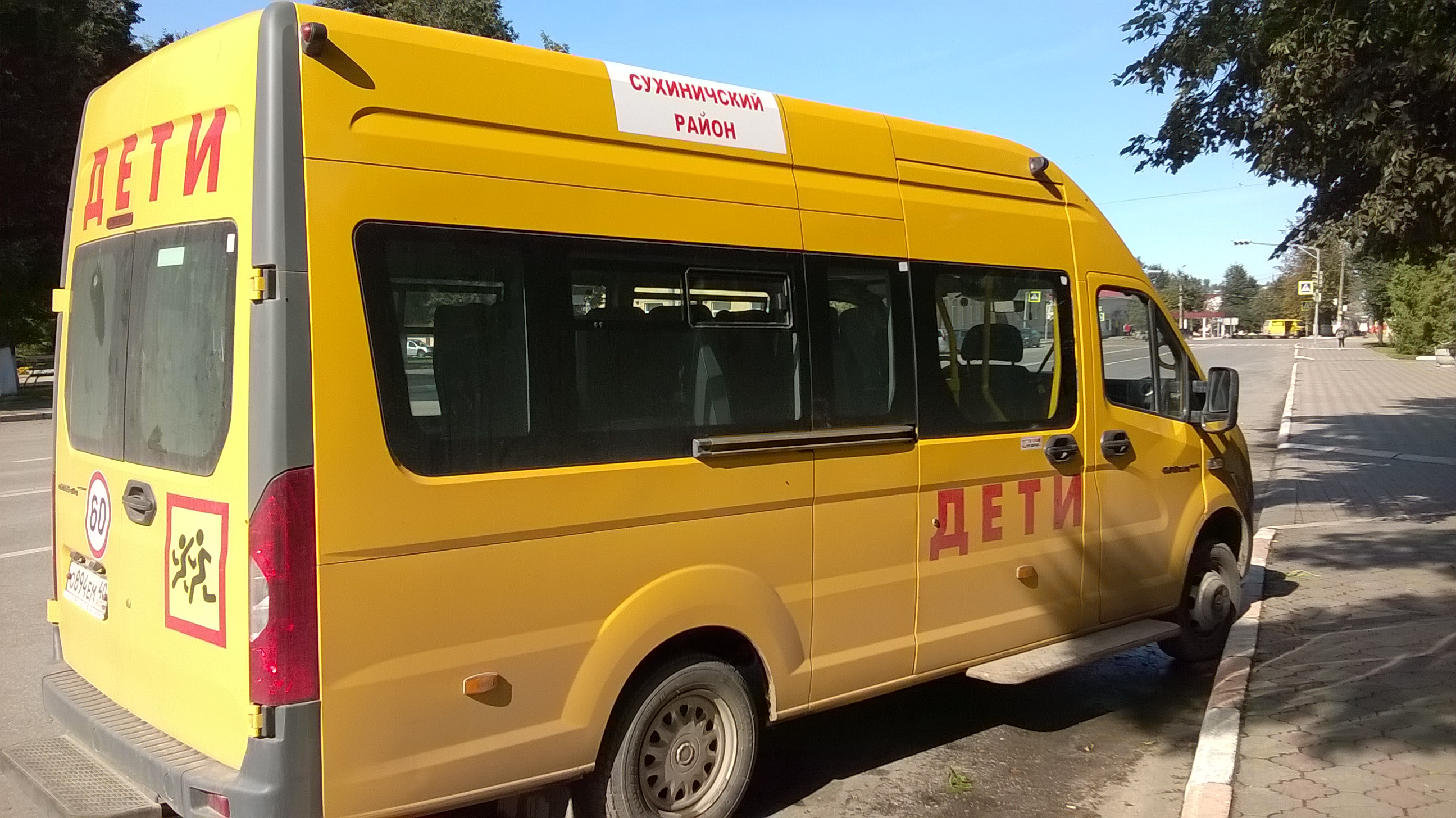
A school bus with the signs in Russian "Сухиничский район" (Sukhinichsky District) and "ДЕТИ" (Children) photographed on the Lenin street of the town of Sukhinichi. Photograph: September 16, 2020

== History ==
Sukhinichsky District was founded on October 1, 1929 as part of the Sukhinichsky Okrug of Western Oblast.

The district became part of Smolensk Oblast in 1937.

The district was occupied by Nazi Germany for 114 days during World War II. There are 11 mass graves of 12,500 Red Army soldiers in the district. 787 houses were destroyed in Sukhinichi, and 389 farmhouses.

The district became part of Kaluga Oblast on July 5, 1944.

== Population ==
- 1931 - 75,433
- 1939 - 55,022
- 1959 - 41,534
- 1970 - 39,077
- 1979 - 33,503
- 1989 - 26,968
- 2002 - 26,968
- 2009 - 24,719
- 2010 - 25,427
- 2011 - 25,343
- 2012 - 25,028
- 2013 - 24,703
- 2014 - 24,286
- 2015 - 24,029
- 2016 - 23,563
- 2017 - 23,519
- 2018 - 23,246
- 2019 - 22,985
- 2020 - 22,934
- 2021 - 22,959
- 2025 - 22,017

72.38% of the districts population live in urban areas such as Sukhinichi and Seredeysky.

According to the 2021 Russian census, 92.96% of the population were Russian, with 0.93% being Armenian, 0.86% Moldovan, 0.80% Ukrainian and 0.56% Azerbaijani.

== Administrative divisions ==
The Sukhinichsky District includes 19 administrative divisions: 2 Urban Settlements and, 17 Rural Settlements. There is 1 city and 1 town. One rural settlement is the Glazkovo Rural Settlement.

== Leadership ==
From 1983 to 1991 the district was led by Anatoly Kovalev as the First Secretary of the District Committee of the CPSU, and from 1992 to October 9, 2015 as the head of the administration. The current head of the administration has been Alexander Kolesnikov since October 10, 2015.
