= Sukhinichi =

Town in Kaluga Oblast, Russia

Sukhinichi Сухиничи
- Town
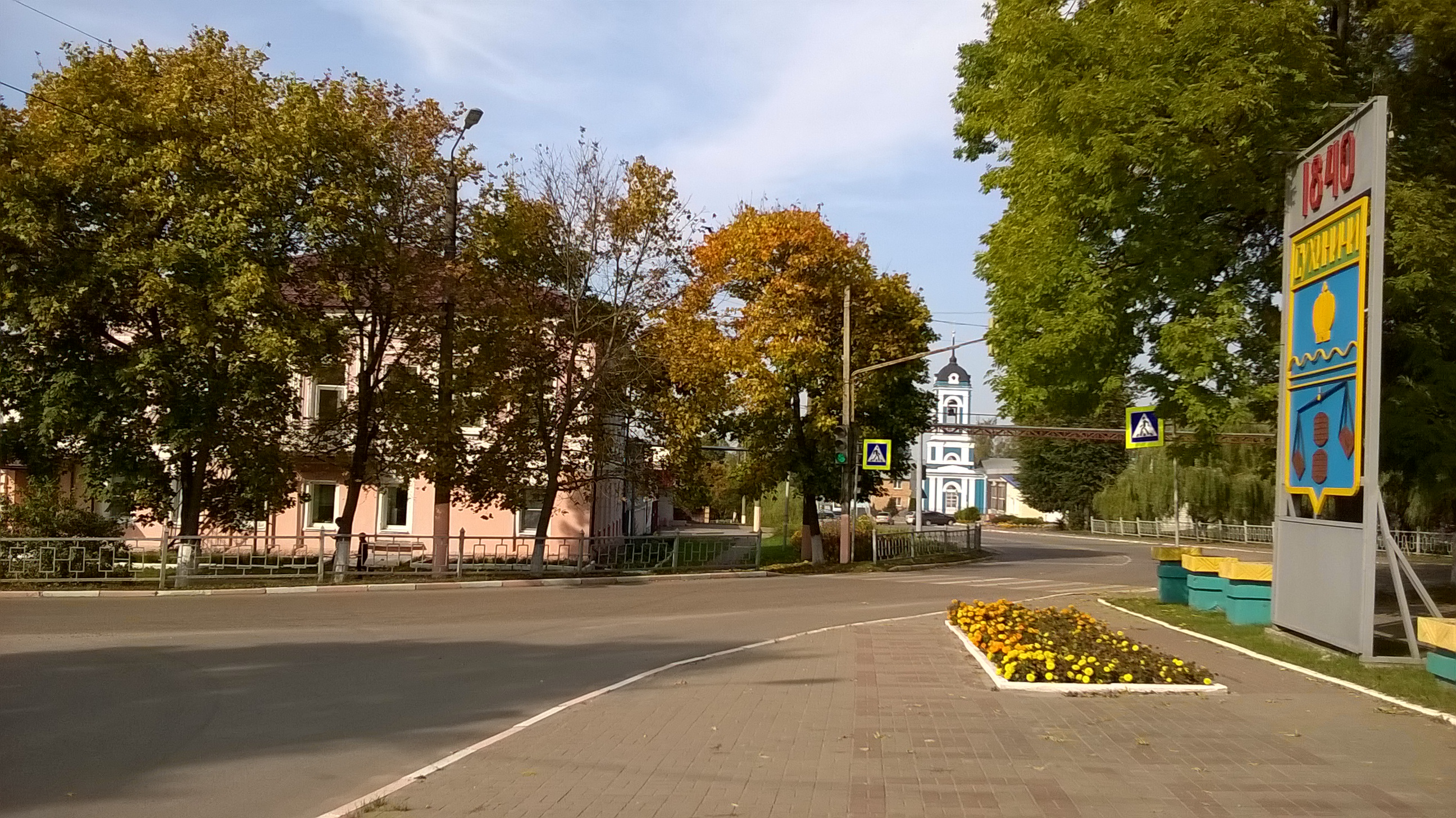
- Sukhinichi crossroads with coat of arms

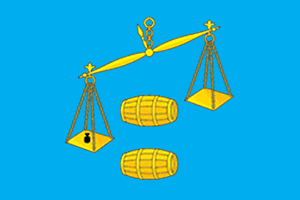
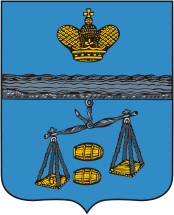
- Flag Coat of arms
- Interactive map of Sukhinichi
- Location of Sukhinichi Sukhinichi (Kaluga Oblast)
- Coordinates: 54°06′N 35°21′E
- Country: Russia
- Federal subject: Kaluga Oblast
- Administrative district: Sukhinichsky District
- Founded: first half of the 16th century
- Town status since: 1840
- Elevation: 200 m (660 ft)

Population (2010 Census)
  - Total: 16,273
  - Estimate (2023): 14,407 (−11.5%)

Administrative status
  - Capital of: Sukhinichsky District

Municipal status
  - Municipal district: Sukhinichsky Municipal District
  - Urban settlement: Sukhinichi Urban Settlement
  - Capital of: Sukhinichsky Municipal District, Sukhinichi Urban Settlement
- Time zone: UTC+3 (MSK)
- Postal codes: 249270, 249271, 249273–249275
- OKTMO ID: 29636101001
- Website: info-suhinichi.ru

Sukhinichi (Russian: Сухи́ничи) is a town and the administrative center of Sukhinichsky District in Kaluga Oblast, Russia, a large railway junction on the Moscow – Kyiv line, situated on the Bryn River 105 kilometers (65 mi) southwest of Kaluga, the administrative center of the oblast. Population: 14,806 (2021 census); 16,273 (2010 census); 16,387 (2002 census); 17,762 (1989 Soviet census).

== History ==
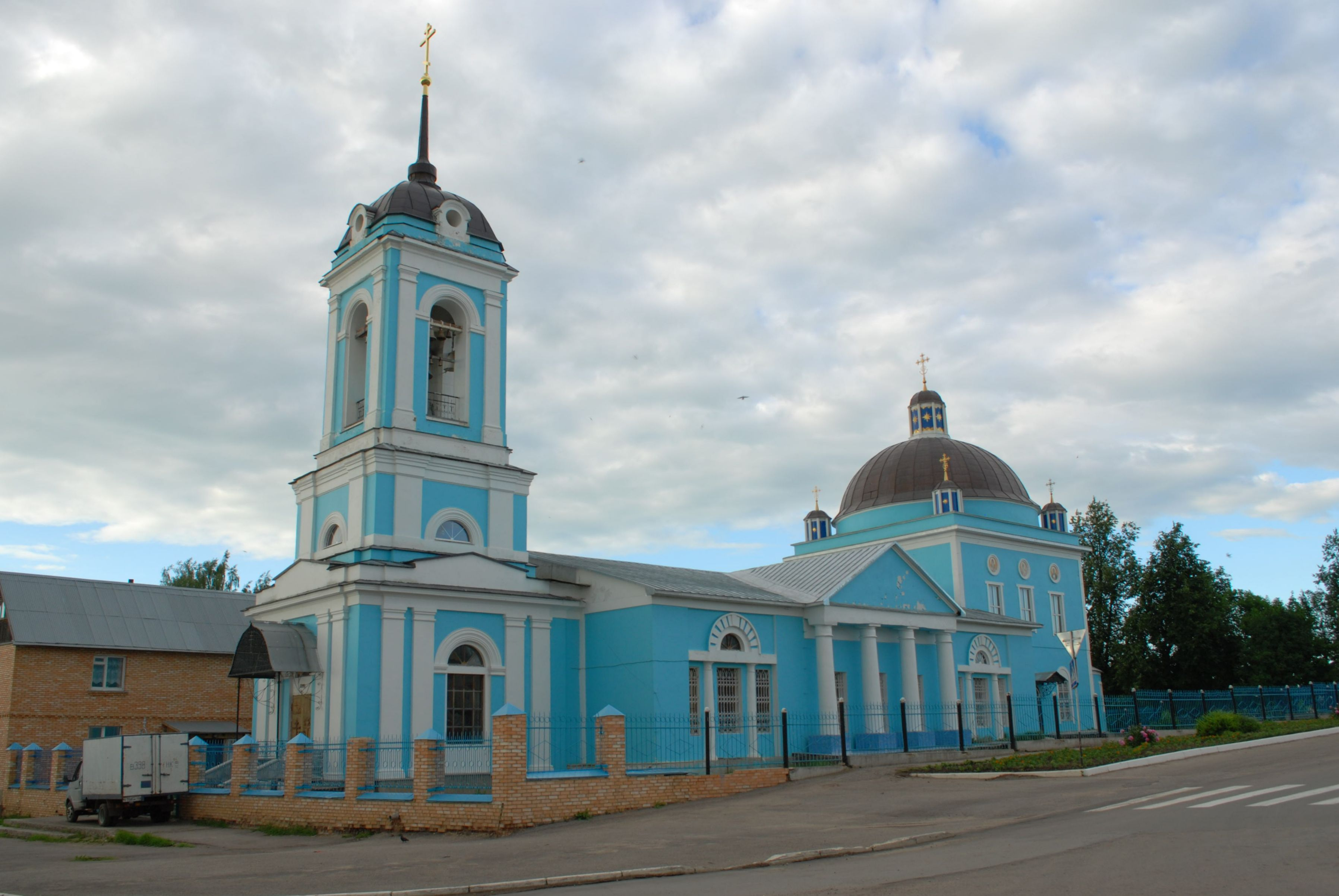
18 century Smolensk temple

The first historical records of the town date from the first half of the 16th century. It was granted town status in 1840. During World War II, Sukhinichi was occupied by the German Army from October 7, 1941 to January 29, 1942. It has grown mainly due to the development of the railway.

During the Great Terror the ravine on the outskirts of the town was used for executions and burials. Since 2008 relatives of the victims have erected crosses there in their memory.

== Administrative and municipal status ==
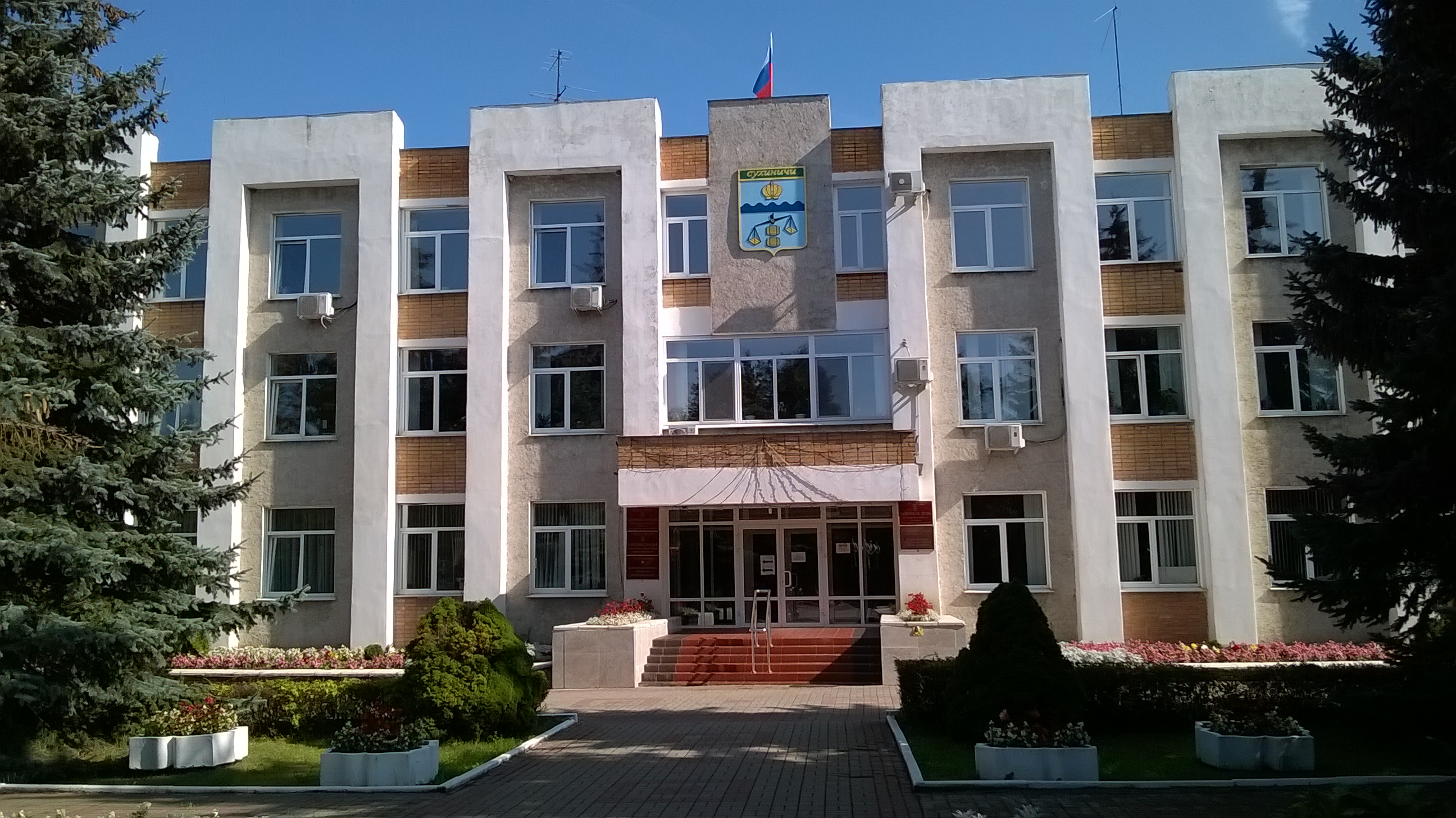
Government building on Lenin Street, 56a

Within the framework of administrative divisions, Sukhinichi serves as the administrative center of Sukhinichsky District, to which it is directly subordinated. As a municipal division, the town of Sukhinichi is incorporated within Sukhinichsky Municipal District as Sukhinichi Urban Settlement.

== Climate ==
Climate data for Sukhinichi (extremes 1926-present)
| Month | Jan | Feb | Mar | Apr | May | Jun | Jul | Aug | Sep | Oct | Nov | Dec | Year |
|---|---|---|---|---|---|---|---|---|---|---|---|---|---|
| Record high °C (°F) | 7.6 (45.7) | 8.1 (46.6) | 20.7 (69.3) | 28.6 (83.5) | 30.7 (87.3) | 32.8 (91.0) | 37.2 (99.0) | 37.8 (100.0) | 28.7 (83.7) | 24.9 (76.8) | 17.1 (62.8) | 9.3 (48.7) | 37.8 (100.0) |
| Mean daily maximum °C (°F) | −4.2 (24.4) | −3.3 (26.1) | 2.6 (36.7) | 11.8 (53.2) | 18.7 (65.7) | 21.9 (71.4) | 24.0 (75.2) | 22.6 (72.7) | 16.6 (61.9) | 9.3 (48.7) | 1.5 (34.7) | −2.8 (27.0) | 9.9 (49.8) |
| Daily mean °C (°F) | −6.6 (20.1) | −6.3 (20.7) | −1.2 (29.8) | 6.7 (44.1) | 13.3 (55.9) | 16.7 (62.1) | 18.8 (65.8) | 17.2 (63.0) | 11.7 (53.1) | 5.6 (42.1) | −0.7 (30.7) | −4.9 (23.2) | 5.9 (42.6) |
| Mean daily minimum °C (°F) | −9.1 (15.6) | −9.3 (15.3) | −4.7 (23.5) | 2.3 (36.1) | 8.1 (46.6) | 11.7 (53.1) | 13.9 (57.0) | 12.3 (54.1) | 7.6 (45.7) | 2.5 (36.5) | −2.9 (26.8) | −7.2 (19.0) | 2.1 (35.8) |
| Record low °C (°F) | −34.5 (−30.1) | −34.0 (−29.2) | −28.6 (−19.5) | −15.5 (4.1) | −4.9 (23.2) | 0.1 (32.2) | 4.5 (40.1) | 0.0 (32.0) | −4.5 (23.9) | −14.3 (6.3) | −25.8 (−14.4) | −37.5 (−35.5) | −37.5 (−35.5) |
| Average precipitation mm (inches) | 41.8 (1.65) | 36.1 (1.42) | 35.0 (1.38) | 36.1 (1.42) | 62.6 (2.46) | 71.8 (2.83) | 86.6 (3.41) | 58.8 (2.31) | 54.2 (2.13) | 60.3 (2.37) | 47.3 (1.86) | 45.5 (1.79) | 636.1 (25.03) |
Source: pogoda.ru.net
