= Rural settlement (Russia) =

A rural settlement (Russian: сельское поселение, romanized: selskoye poseleniye) is a self-governing political division in Russia. A rural settlement is composed of one or more contiguous rural communities: towns, villages, hamlets, farmsteads, exurbs, resorts, villas, stanitsas (Cossack settlements), kishlaks (settlements of Turkic peoples), auls (Caucasian fortified villages), or any other type. Political authority in rural settlements is exercised by the inhabitants, either directly or through elected (or otherwise constituted) bodies.

A rural settlement is a constituent part of a municipal district, a political entity created as part of municipal reforms in 2004. Prior to 2004, the district (raion), inherited from the Soviet Union, had been the primary division next lowest below oblast (province). (A municipal district may, in addition to or instead of rural settlements, include urban settlements, which are composed of various urban communities.)

The term "rural settlement" is also used in its generic sense to denote any rural inhabited place.

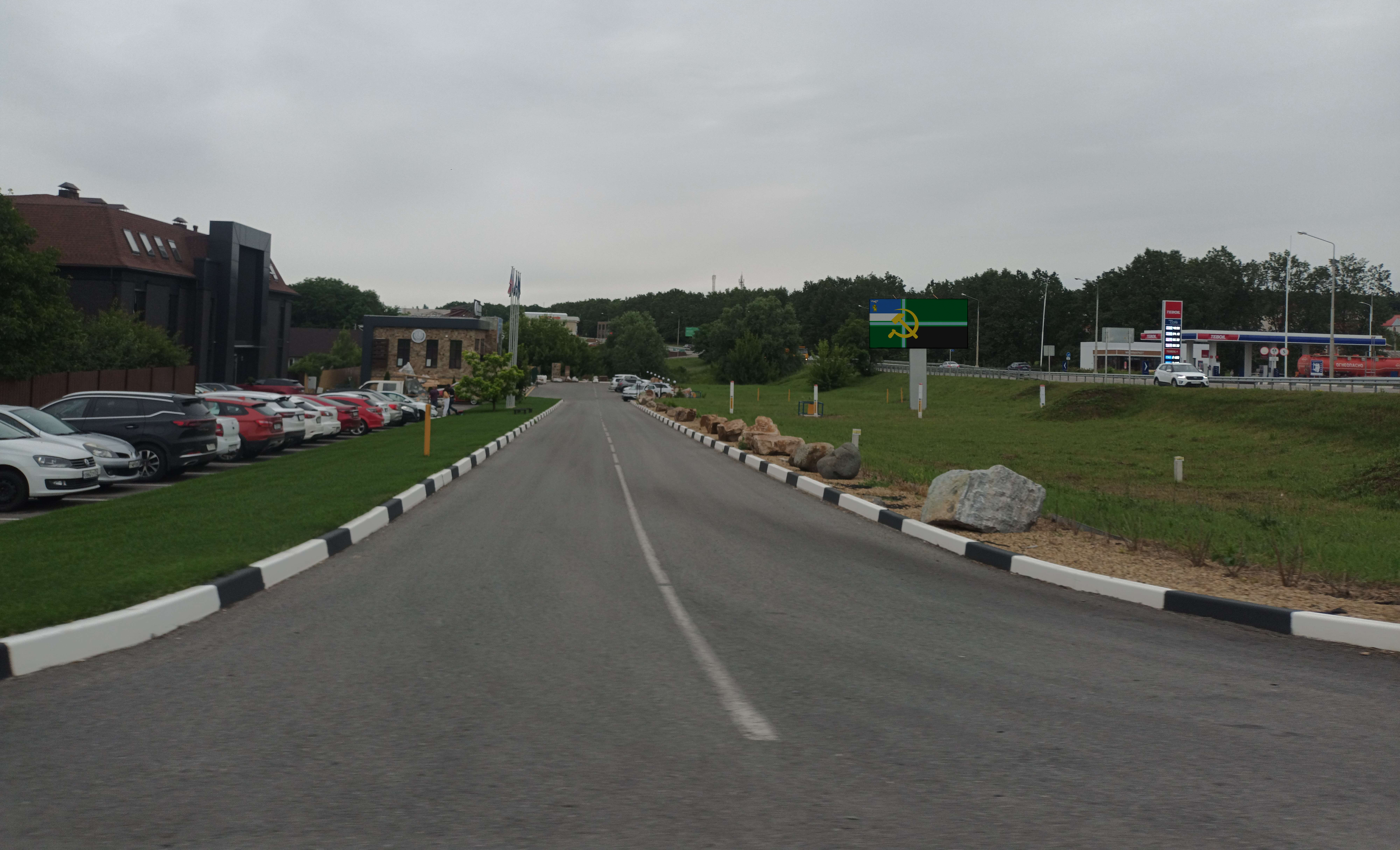
Example of rural settlement in Russia.

== Characteristics ==
Rural settlement as a formal political division was provided for in the 2003 law "On The General Principles of Organization of Local Government in the Russian Federation", which was promulgated as part of municipal reform. Rural settlements often correspond to a village council of Soviet times, or a parish in the pre-Soviet and post-Soviet periods (for one example among thousands, the Tyamshanskaya Rural Settlement in the Pskovsky District of Pskov Oblast).

In some areas, the term "village council" is still used as a synonym for "rural settlement", and even still used in formal names of entities (for instance, Novinsky Village Council in the Bogorodsky District of Nizhny Novgorod Oblast).

The rural settlement serves as the administrative center for the locality, which is defined as taking into account local traditions and existing social infrastructure. The rural settlement is where, in accordance with the laws of the Russian Federation, the lowest level representative body is constituted.

As a general rule, a rural settlement will consist of either one rural community with a population of 1,000 or more, or several rural communities each with a population less than 1,000. In areas of greater population density, a rural settlement may consist of either one rural community with a population of 3,000 or more, or several rural communities each with a population less than 3,000.

The population of rural settlement usually varies from a few dozen people up to 15,000 or 20,000 inhabitants. There are rural settlements with a population of more than 30,000, and the most populous rural settlement, Ordzhonikidzevskaya in Ingushetia, had a population at the 2013 census of more than 60,000.

The boundaries of a rural settlement (when composed of two or more communities) are generally set to allow a person to walk to the administrative center and back during a working day. Exceptions are made for areas with low population density and for remote and inaccessible areas.

Year	Number of Rural Settlements (as of January 1)	Reference
2010	19,591	
2011	18,996	
2012	18,883	
2013	18,772	
2014	18,525	

== See also ==
- Bolshekolpanskoe Rural Settlement, example article on a rural settlement
- Subdivisions of Russia
- Town of district significance
- Selsoviet
